= List of York City F.C. players (1–24 appearances) =

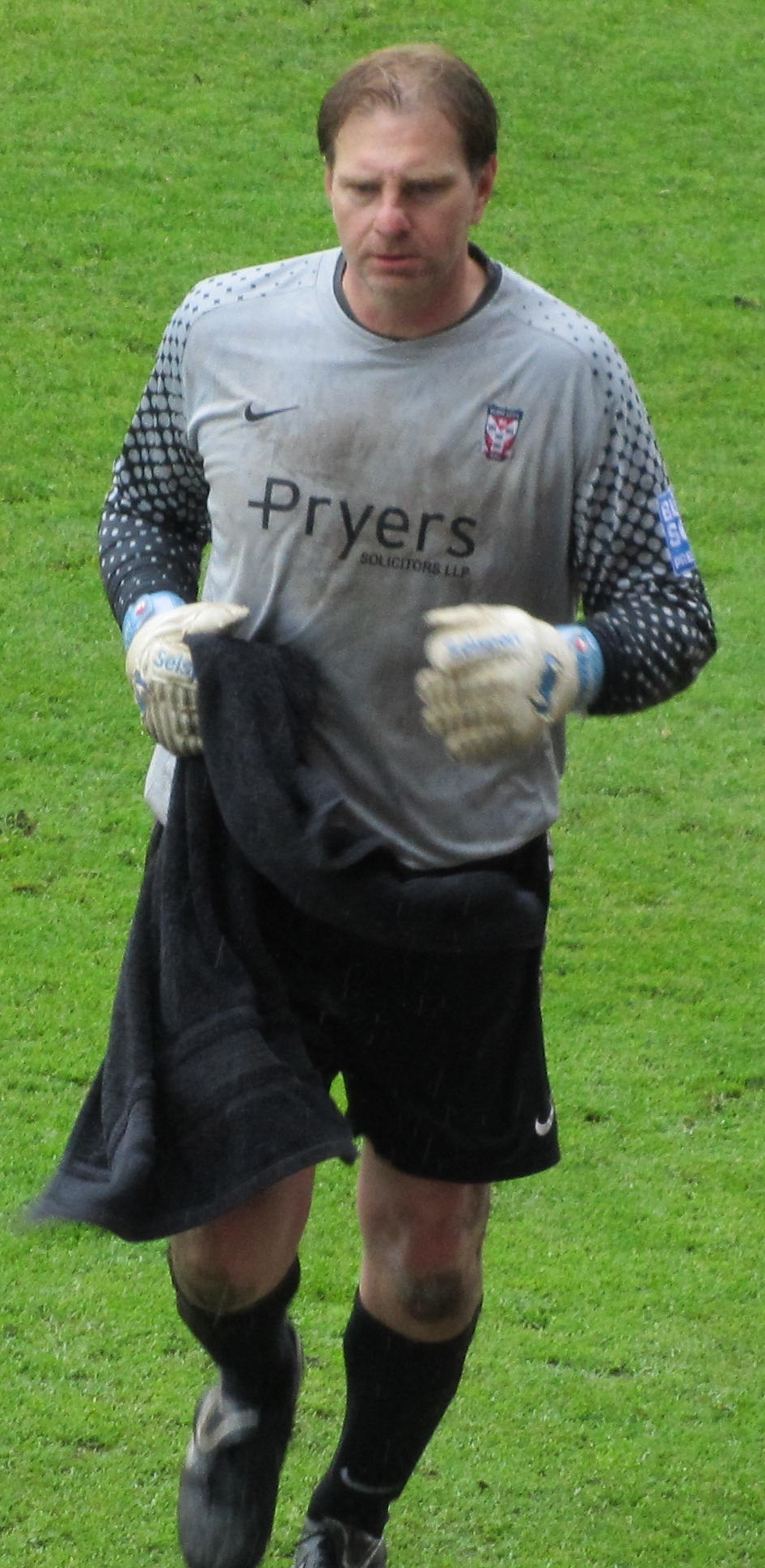
Paul Musselwhite was 43 years old on his last appearance for York City in 2012, making him the oldest player to play for the club.

York City Football Club is a professional association football club based in York, North Yorkshire, England. Formed in 1922, York played in the Midland League for seven years before being elected to the Football League ahead of the 1929–30 season. Since that time, the club's first team have competed in numerous competitions, and all players who have played between 25 and 99 such matches, either as a member of the starting eleven or as a substitute, are listed below.

Each player's details include the duration of his York career, his typical playing position while with the club, and the number of matches played and goals scored in domestic league matches and in all senior competitive matches. Where applicable, the list also includes the national team for which the player was selected, and the number of senior international caps he won.

== Introduction ==
As of the date specified below, 686 players had completed their York career before reaching the 25-match milestone. Many of these players spent only a short period of their careers at York before seeking opportunities in other teams. Players who have gone on to experience football in the English top tier include Chris Iwelumo, when playing for Wolverhampton Wanderers, and Neil Warnock, when managing Notts County, Sheffield United, Queens Park Rangers and Crystal Palace. At international level, Iwelumo went on to represent Scotland and Leo Bertos became the first former York player to represent his country at a FIFA World Cup when appearing for New Zealand at the 2010 tournament. Four players with under 25 appearances went on to manage the club; these were Jock Collier, Tom Mitchell, Viv Busby and Steve Torpey.

Many players spent brief periods with York on loan from other clubs. Some were young players gaining experience; Mike Stowell went on to play more than 400 matches for Wolverhampton Wanderers and Mike Cook played for the Cambridge United team that won promotion in the 1990 Fourth Division play-offs. Other loanees had an established career but were not needed by their owning club; Steve Davis scored on his debut for York, while Courtney Pitt came on as a substitute in the 2010 Conference Premier play-off final.

As of the date below, 13 players have left the club with 24 career appearances; Bobby Warrender, Fred Marlow, Brad Halliday, Bradley Fewster, Tom Mitchell, John Hammerton, Liam George, Jamie Price, Nick Pope, Richard Tindale, Phil Taylor, Byron Webster and Thierry Latty-Fairweather. The list includes 16 players who are still contracted to the club, and so can add to their totals.

== Key ==
- The list is ordered first by number of appearances in total, then by number of league appearances, and then if necessary by date of debut.
- Appearances as a substitute are included.
- Statistics are correct up to and including the match played on 21 November 2026. Where a player left the club permanently after this date, his statistics are updated to his date of leaving.

Player
Players marked * were registered for the club as at the date specified above.
Players with name in italics and marked † were on loan from another club for the duration of their York career. The loaning club is noted in the Notes column.

Positions key
| Pre-1960s | | 1960s– | |
|---|---|---|---|
| GK | Goalkeeper | | |
| FB | Full-back | DF | Defender |
| HB | Half-back | MF | Midfielder |
| FW | Forward | | |
| U | Utility player | | |

Position
Playing positions are listed according to the tactical formations that were employed at the time. Thus the change in the names of defensive and midfield positions reflects the tactical evolution that occurred from the 1960s onwards.
Club career
Club career is defined as the first and last calendar years in which the player appeared for the club in any of the competitions listed below.
League appearances and league goals
League appearances and goals comprise those in the Midland League, the Football League and the Football Conference/National League. Appearances in the 1939–40 Football League season, abandoned after three matches because of the Second World War, are excluded.
Total appearances and total goals
Total appearances and goals comprise those in the Midland League, Football League (including play-offs), Football Conference/National League (including play-offs), FA Cup, Football League Third Division North Cup, Football League Cup, Associate Members' Cup/Football League Trophy/EFL Trophy, FA Trophy and Conference Cup/Conference League Cup. Matches in wartime competitions are excluded.
International selection
Countries are listed only for players who have been selected for international football. Only the highest level of international competition is given, except where a player competed for more than one country, in which case the highest level reached for each country is shown.
Caps
For players having played at full international level, the caps column counts the number of such appearances during his career with the club.

== Players with fewer than 25 appearances ==
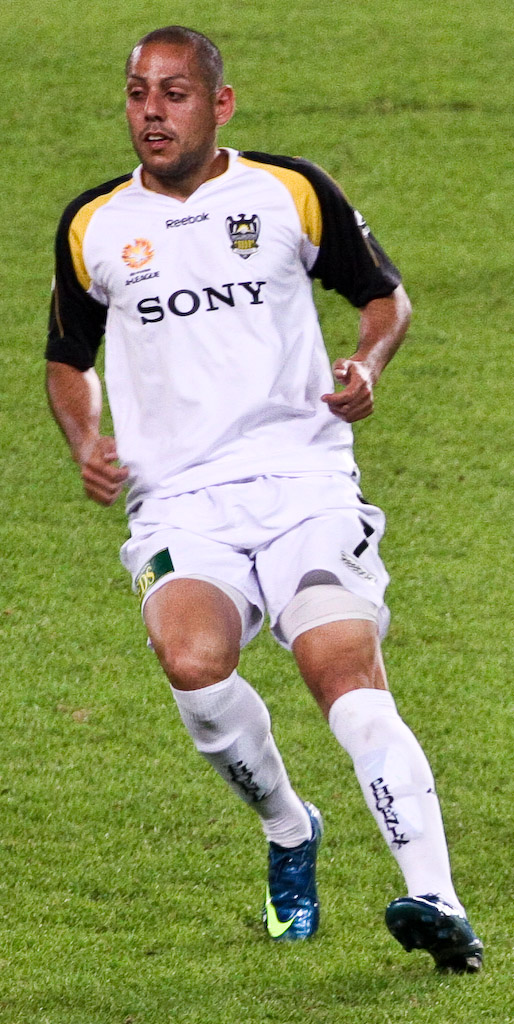
Leo Bertos spent two months at York before being released with five appearances to his name.

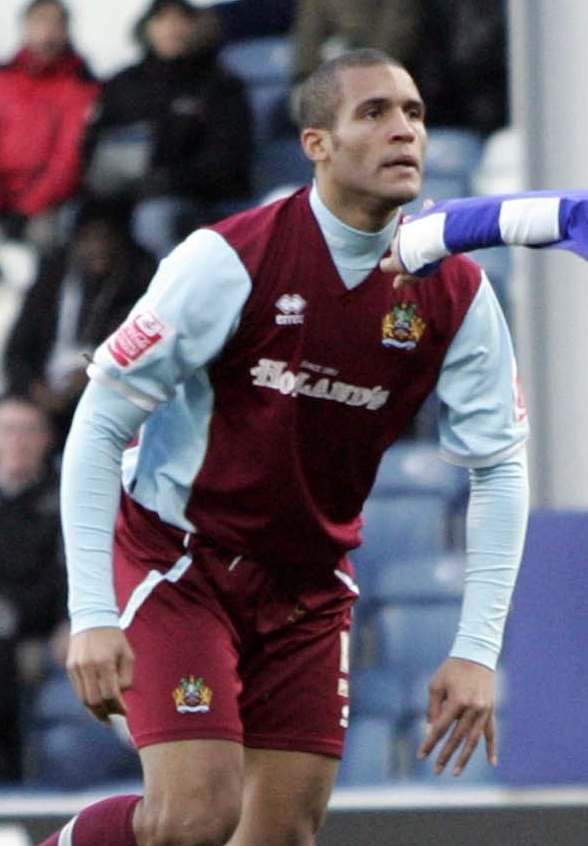
Clarke Carlisle made 14 appearances for York in 2012.

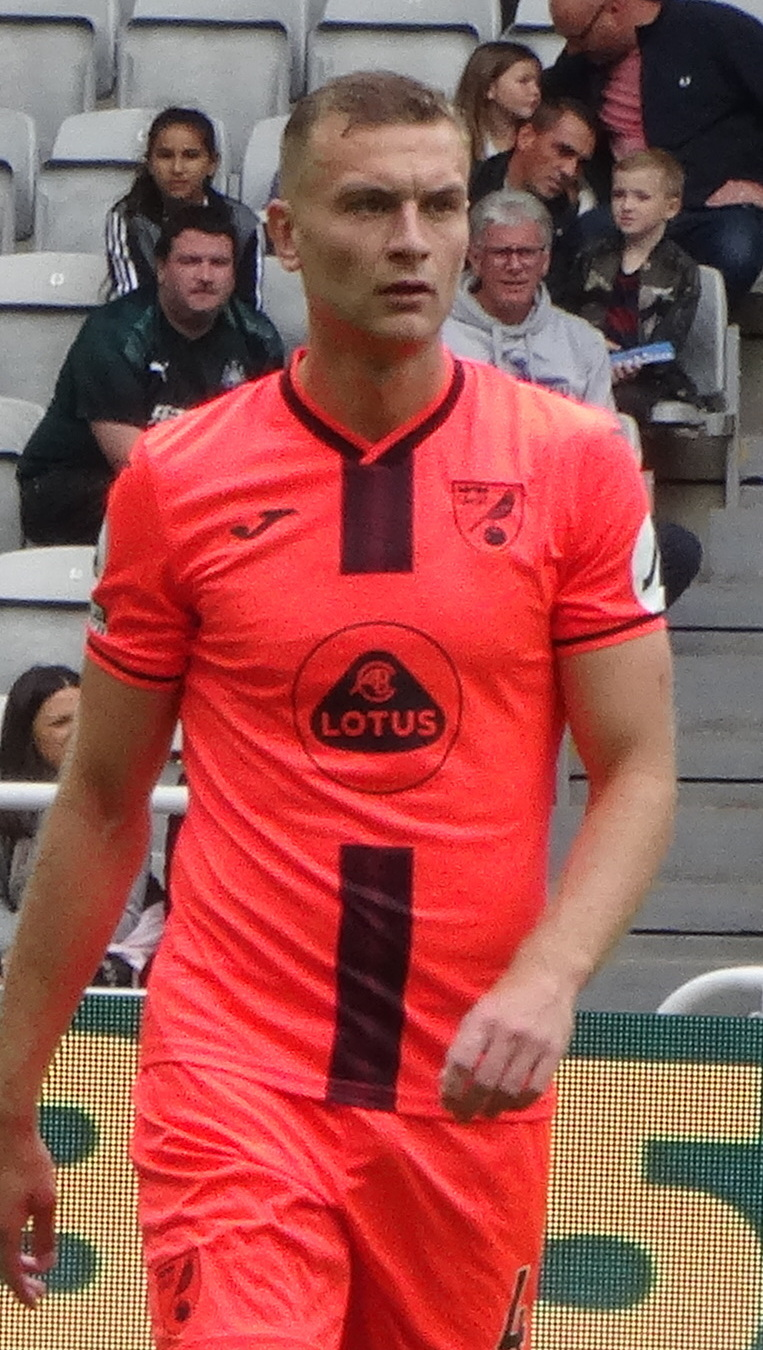
Ben Gibson appeared in the 2012 FA Trophy final and the 2012 Conference Premier play-off final while on loan from Middlesbrough.

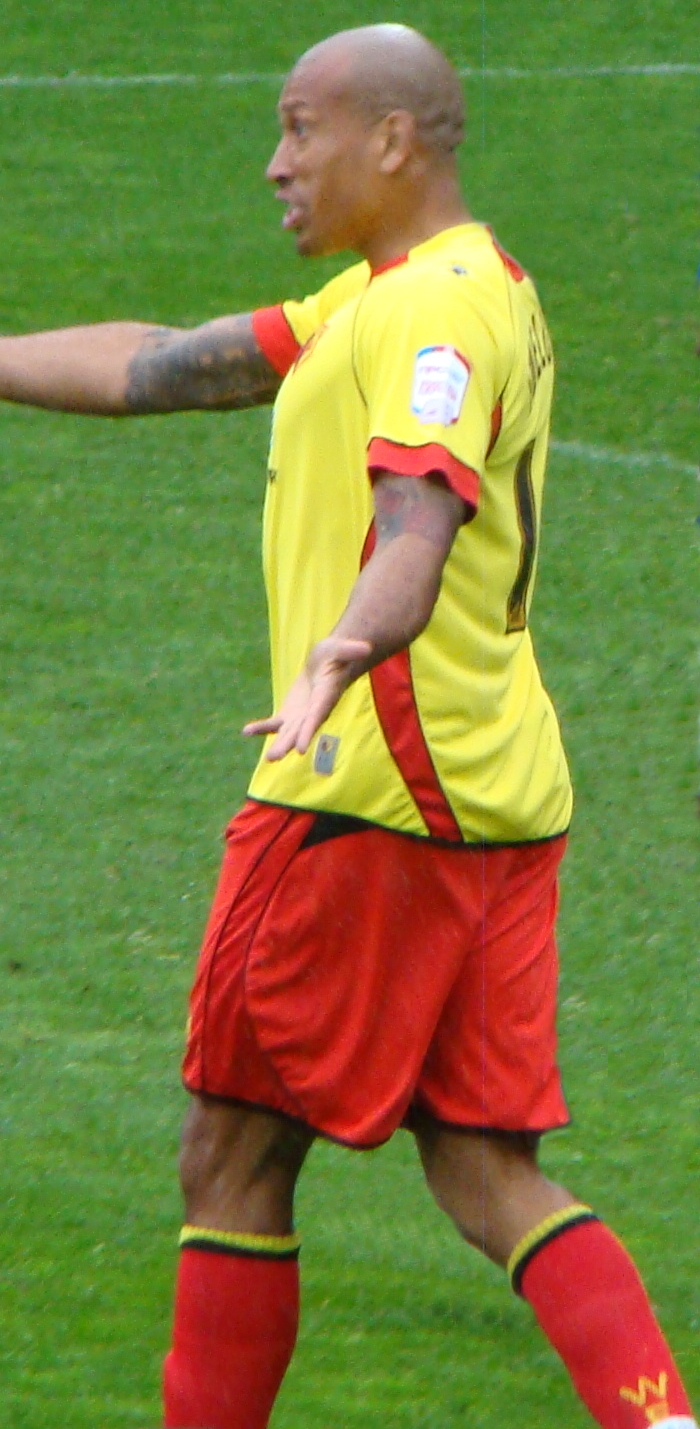
Chris Iwelumo scored 3 goals in 16 appearances while on loan from Stoke City.

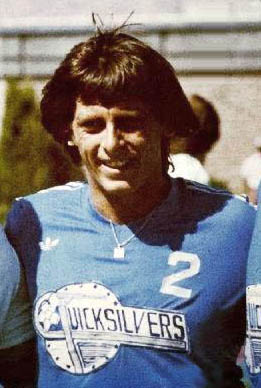
Brian Joy joined York after a spell in the United States, but was released after playing in 22 matches.

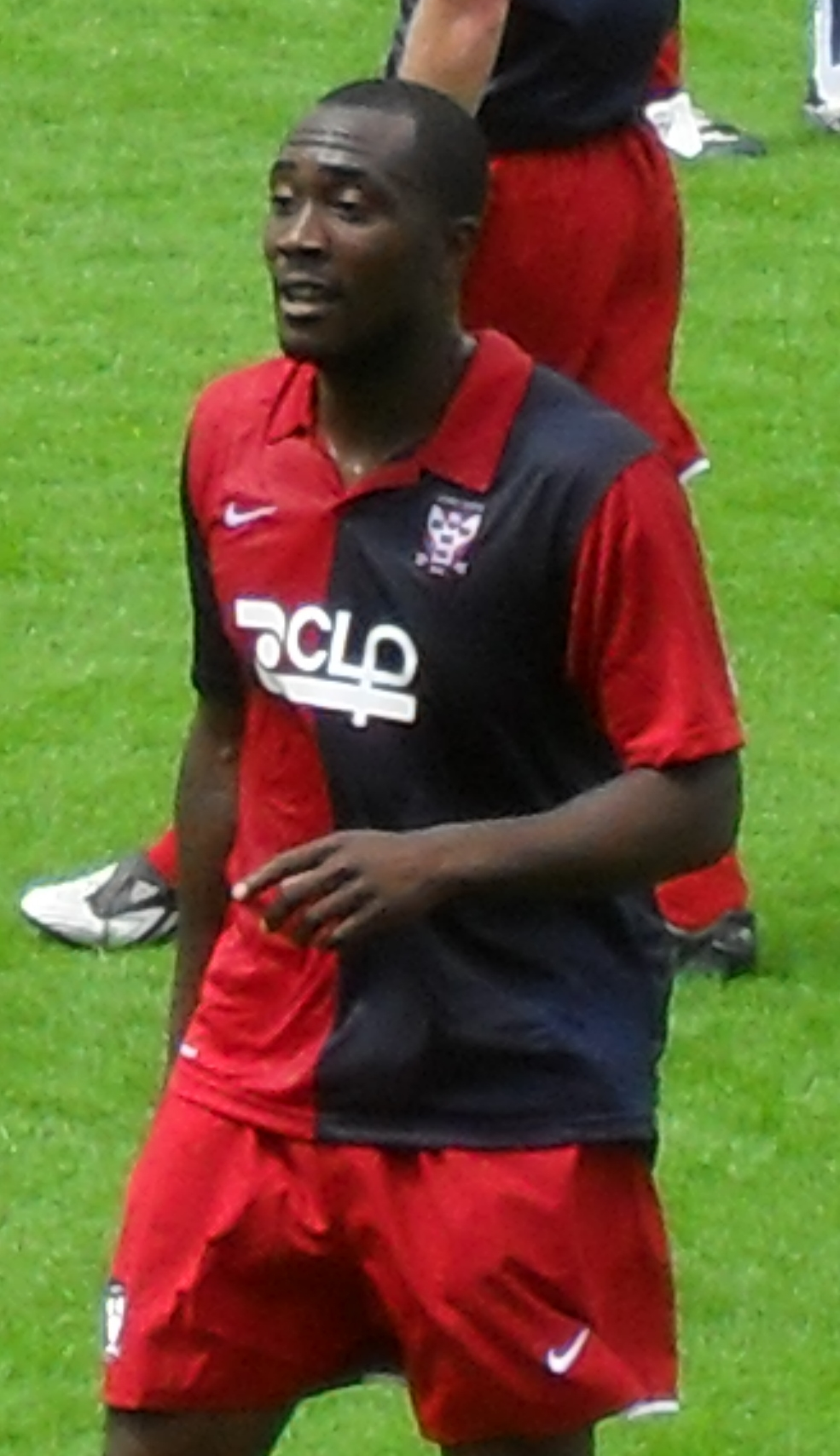
Richard Pacquette had a reputation as a cup specialist, scoring important goals in the FA Cup and FA Trophy against Crewe Alexandra and Newport County respectively.

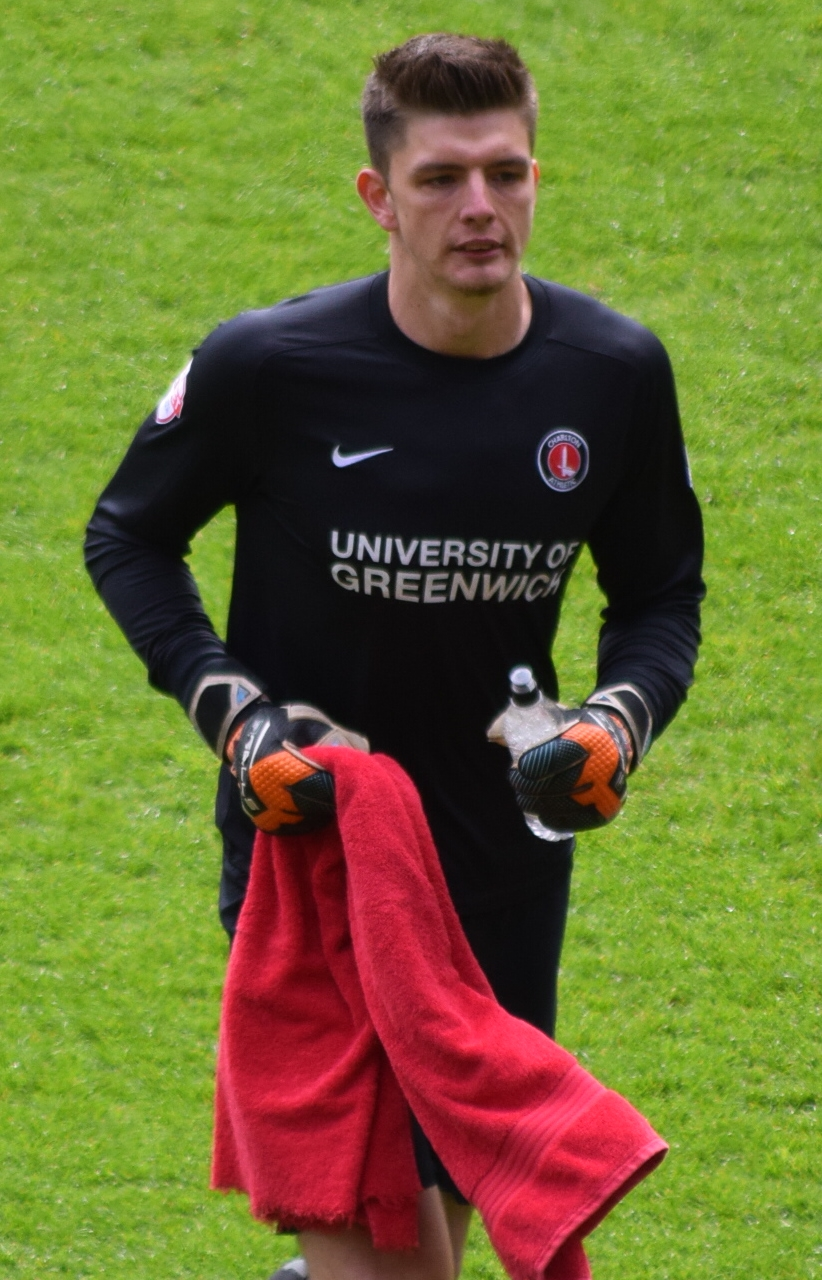
On-loan Charlton Athletic goalkeeper Nick Pope was influential in York reaching the 2014 League Two play-offs.

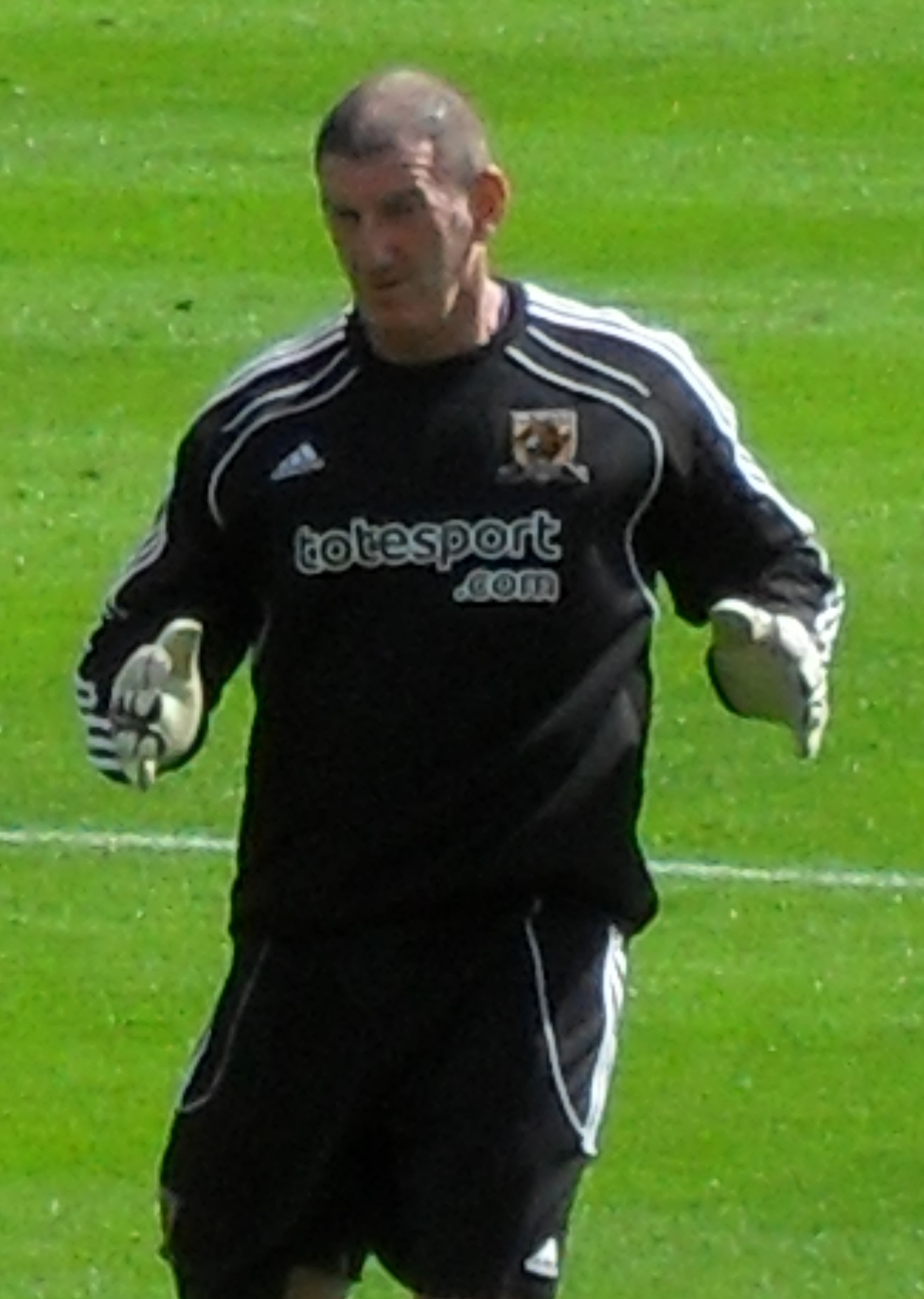
Goalkeeper Mark Prudhoe conceded five goals in two matches while on loan at York from Stoke.

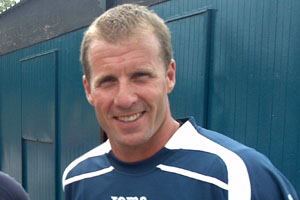
Mike Stowell went on to make over 400 appearances for Wolverhampton Wanderers.

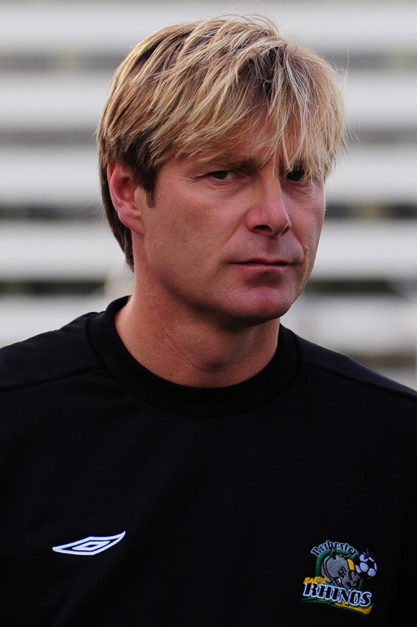
Darren Tilley was a regular goalscorer for the reserve team but failed to establish himself in the first team, being released in 1993 after making 22 appearances.

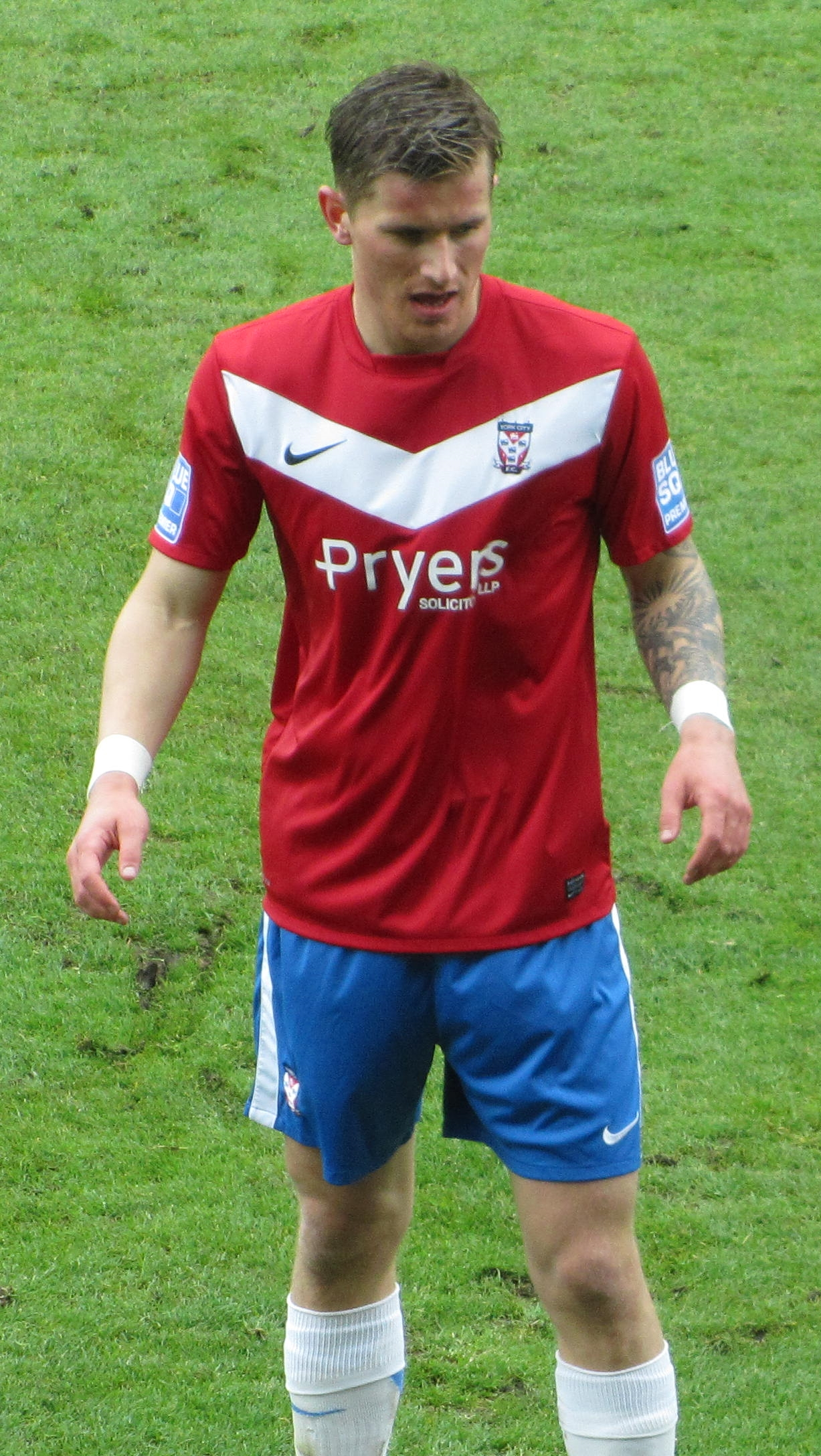
Erik Tønne's winning goal against Braintree Town secured York a place in the 2012 Conference Premier play-offs.

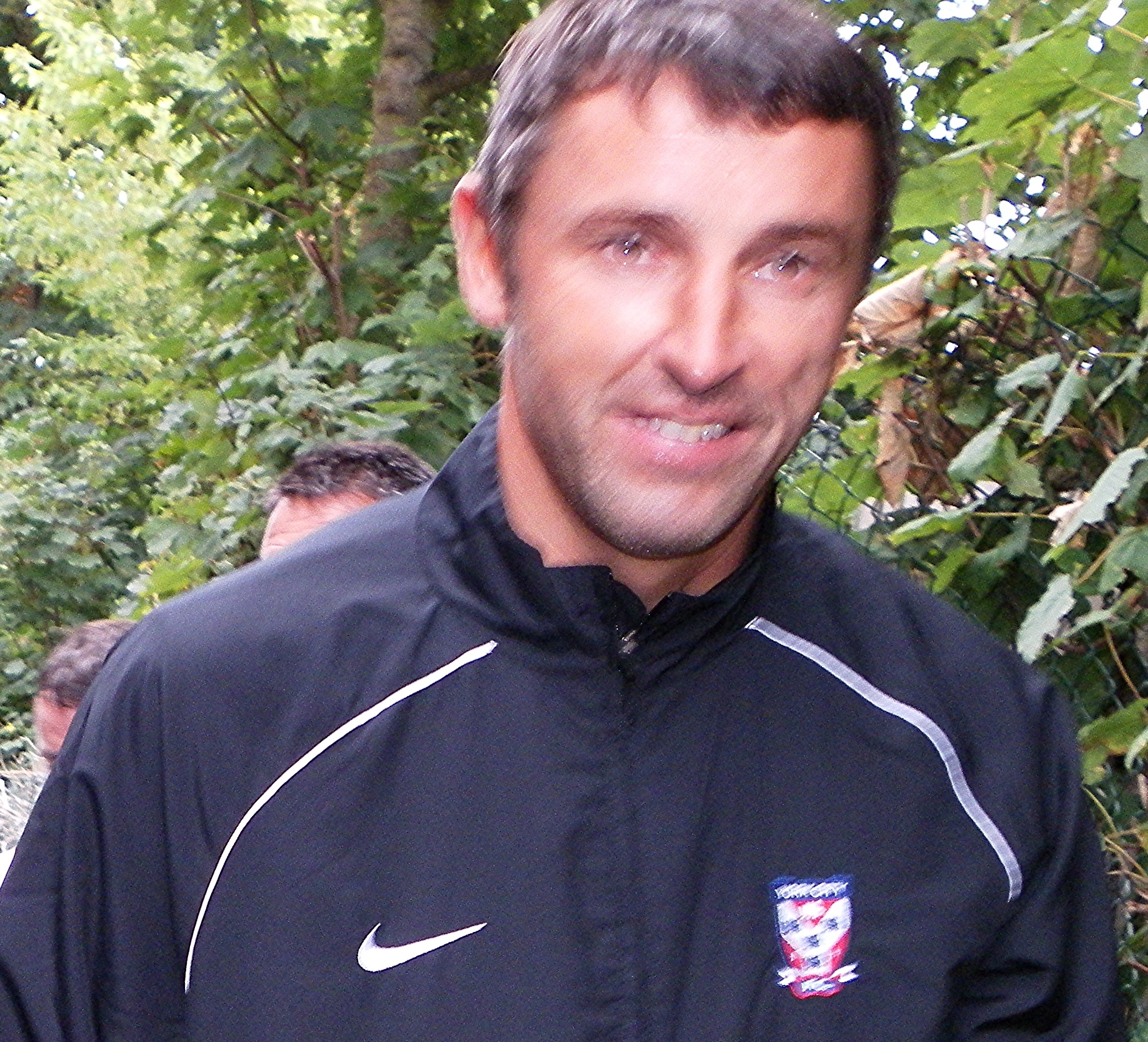
Youth-team coach Steve Torpey declared himself available for selection amidst a goal drought, and played two matches for York in 2009.

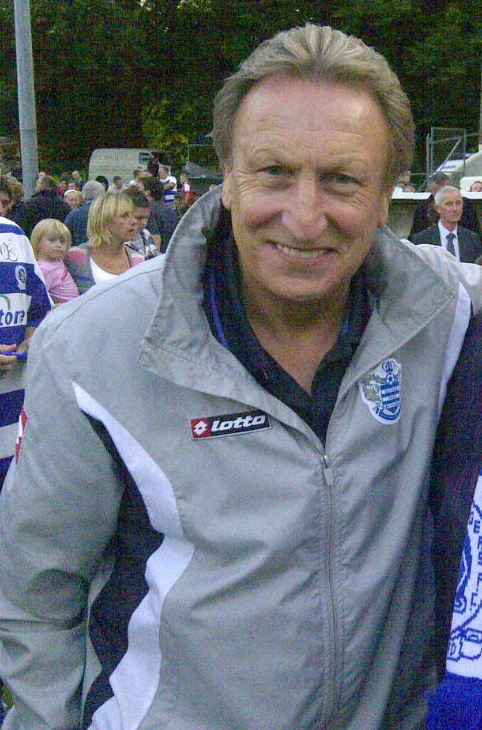
Neil Warnock endured a difficult spell with York, making five appearances before leaving after six months with the club.

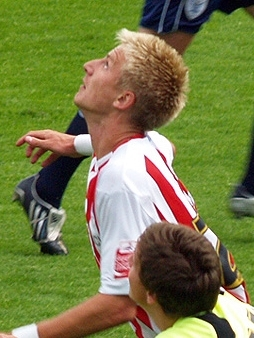
Byron Webster made 24 appearances for York from 2004 to 2006.

Table of players, including playing position, club statistics and international selection
| Player | Pos | Club career | League | | Total | | International selection | Caps | Notes | Ref |
| Player | Pos | Club career | Apps | Goals | Apps | Goals | International selection | Caps | Notes | Ref |
|---|---|---|---|---|---|---|---|---|---|---|
| Bobby Warrender | FW | 1952–1954 | 24 | 5 | 24 | 5 | — | — | | |
| Fred Marlow | HB | 1953–1954 | 24 | 0 | 24 | 0 | — | — | | |
| Brad Halliday † | DF / MF | 2014–2015 | 24 | 1 | 24 | 1 | — | — | (Note: Middlesbrough) | |
| Bradley Fewster † | FW | 2015–2016 | 24 | 8 | 24 | 8 | England under-19 | — | | |
| Tom Mitchell | FW | 1931–1933 | 23 | 5 | 24 | 5 | — | — | (Note: Player who also managed the club.) | |
| John Hammerton | FW | 1927–1928 | 22 | 18 | 24 | 21 | — | — | | |
| Liam George | FW | 2003–2004 | 22 | 3 | 24 | 3 | Republic of Ireland under-21 | — | | |
| Jamie Price | DF | 2005–2006 | 22 | 0 | 24 | 0 | — | — | | |
| Nick Pope † | GK | 2013–2014 | 22 | 0 | 24 | 0 | England | 0 | (Note: Charlton Athletic) | |
| Richard Tindale | FW | 1923 | 21 | 1 | 24 | 1 | — | — | | |
| Phil Taylor | MF | 1975–1978 | 21 | 1 | 24 | 1 | — | — | | |
| Byron Webster | MF | 2004–2006 | 21 | 1 | 24 | 1 | — | — | | |
| Thierry Latty-Fairweather | DF | 2023–2024 | 21 | 2 | 24 | 2 | — | — | | |
| Joe Porteus | HB | 1946–1947 | 23 | 0 | 23 | 0 | — | — | | |
| Eric Burgin | HB | 1949–1951 | 23 | 0 | 23 | 0 | — | — | | |
| Peter Perry | DF | 1962–1963 | 23 | 0 | 23 | 0 | — | — | | |
| William Park | HB | 1946–1947 | 22 | 1 | 23 | 1 | — | — | | |
| Albert Hobson | FW | 1956–1957 | 22 | 1 | 23 | 1 | — | — | | |
| Jim Goldie | FW | 1963–1964 | 22 | 7 | 23 | 7 | — | — | | |
| Connor Smith | MF | 2017–2018 | 22 | 1 | 23 | 1 | — | — | | |
| Les Horton | HB | 1950–1951 | 21 | 0 | 23 | 0 | — | — | | |
| Matt Fry | DF | 2016–2017 | 21 | 2 | 23 | 2 | — | — | | |
| Shaq Forde † | FW | 2023 | 20 | 9 | 23 | 9 | — | — | (Note: Watford) | |
| Tim Clarke | GK | 1996–1997 | 17 | 0 | 23 | 0 | — | — | | |
| Danny Racchi | MF | 2010–2011 | 17 | 1 | 23 | 2 | — | — | | |
| John Brown | FB | 1948–1949 | 22 | 0 | 22 | 0 | — | — | | |
| Ken Thompson | FB | 1950–1951 | 22 | 0 | 22 | 0 | — | — | | |
| Chris Galvin † | MF | 1976–1977 | 22 | 6 | 22 | 6 | England under-18 | — | (Note: Hull City) | |
| Jackie Scott | MF | 1963–1964 | 21 | 3 | 22 | 3 | Northern Ireland | 0 | | |
| Darren Tilley | FW | 1992–1993 | 21 | 0 | 22 | 0 | — | — | | |
| James Turley | FW | 1999–2001 | 21 | 2 | 22 | 2 | — | — | | |
| Morgan Williams * | DF | 2026–present | 21 | 1 | 22 | 1 | — | — | | |
| Gus Mafuta | MF | 2022–2023 | 19 | 0 | 22 | 0 | England C | — | | |
| Brian Joy | DF / MF | 1976–1977 | 18 | 0 | 22 | 0 | — | — | | |
| Lloyd Richards | MF | 1980–1981 | 18 | 1 | 22 | 2 | — | — | | |
| Danny Pilkington | MF | 2011–2012 | 18 | 2 | 22 | 2 | — | — | | |
| Nathan Dyer | DF | 2018–2019 | 16 | 0 | 22 | 1 | — | — | | |
| Barney McCabe | FW | 1931–1932 | 21 | 10 | 21 | 10 | — | — | | |
| Joseph Hawkins | HB | 1938–1939 | 21 | 1 | 21 | 1 | — | — | (Note: Also played for York City during the Second World War.) (Note: Player statistics exclude three matches played in the aborted 1939–40 season.) | |
| Matty Dixon | MF | 2016 | 20 | 0 | 21 | 0 | — | — | | |
| Jonny Burn † | DF | 2017–2018 | 20 | 3 | 21 | 3 | — | — | (Note: Bristol Rovers) | |
| Will Davies | FW | 2023–2024 | 20 | 4 | 21 | 4 | — | — | | |
| Viv Busby | FW | 1982–1983 | 19 | 4 | 21 | 4 | — | — | | |
| Ross Greenwood | MF | 2006–2007 | 19 | 0 | 21 | 0 | — | — | | |
| Ryan Brobbel † | MF | 2013–2014 | 19 | 4 | 21 | 4 | Northern Ireland under-21 | — | | |
| Louis Almond | FW | 2017–2018 | 19 | 2 | 21 | 2 | — | — | | |
| Rob Matthews | FW | 1995–1996 | 17 | 1 | 21 | 1 | England schools | — | | |
| David McDermott | MF | 2010–2011 | 17 | 1 | 21 | 1 | — | — | | |
| Ron Benson | FW | 1949–1950 | 20 | 3 | 20 | 3 | — | — | | |
| Mark Hotte | DF | 2005–2006 | 20 | 0 | 20 | 0 | — | — | | |
| Sam McNab | FW | 1954–1955 | 19 | 3 | 20 | 3 | — | — | | |
| Stuart Alderson | MF | 1967–1968 | 19 | 5 | 20 | 5 | — | — | | |
| Lewis McMahon | MF | 2006–2007 | 19 | 1 | 20 | 1 | England C | — | | |
| Will Hayhurst † | MF | 2014 | 18 | 1 | 20 | 1 | Republic of Ireland under-21 | — | (Note: Preston North End) | |
| James Gray | FW | 2017–2018 | 18 | 1 | 20 | 1 | Northern Ireland under-21 | — | (Note: Torquay United) | |
| Gerry Francis | MF | 1961–1962 | 16 | 4 | 20 | 5 | — | — | | |
| Derek Fazackerley | DF | 1988 | 16 | 0 | 20 | 0 | — | — | | |
| Len Duckham | FW | 1926–1927 | 15 | 7 | 20 | 9 | — | — | | |
| Eddie Flood | DF | 1981–1982 | 15 | 0 | 20 | 0 | — | — | | |
| Mackenzie Heaney | MF | 2021–2022 | 14 | 2 | 20 | 2 | England under-17 Scotland under-16 | — | | |
| Jimmy Lodge | FB | 1926 | 19 | 0 | 19 | 0 | — | — | | |
| Tom Hindle | FW | 1949 | 19 | 3 | 19 | 3 | — | — | | |
| Malcolm Scott | DF | 1963–1964 | 19 | 0 | 19 | 0 | — | — | | |
| Shaun Smith | DF | 2004–2005 | 19 | 0 | 19 | 0 | — | — | | |
| Kenny McEvoy | MF | 2015–2016 | 19 | 2 | 19 | 2 | Republic of Ireland under-21 | — | (Note: Tottenham Hotspur) | |
| Dave Donaldson | FW | 1932–1933 | 18 | 1 | 19 | 1 | — | — | | |
| Tommy Stanley | MF | 1981–1982 | 18 | 0 | 19 | 0 | — | — | | |
| Jackie Robertson | FW | 1957–1958 | 17 | 5 | 19 | 6 | — | — | | |
| Joe Scott | FW | 1960–1961 | 17 | 2 | 19 | 2 | — | — | | |
| Clovis Kamdjo | MF | 2016–2018 | 17 | 1 | 19 | 1 | — | — | | |
| Dave Chambers | U | 1971–1972 | 16 | 1 | 19 | 2 | — | — | (Note: Southend United) | |
| Daniel Nti | MF | 2016–2017 | 16 | 1 | 19 | 1 | — | — | | |
| Luke James | FW | 2022–2023 | 16 | 1 | 19 | 1 | England C | — | | |
| Charlie Flood | FW | 1926–1927 | 15 | 17 | 19 | 19 | — | — | | |
| Shaun Pejic | DF | 2009 | 15 | 0 | 19 | 0 | Wales under-21 | — | | |
| Matthew Blinkhorn | FW | 2012 | 15 | 1 | 19 | 2 | — | — | | |
| Tom Allan | DF | 2012–2014; 2018–2019 | 15 | 0 | 19 | 0 | — | — | | |
| Zanda Siziba | MF | 2023–2024 | 15 | 2 | 19 | 2 | — | — | | |
| Kai Kennedy | MF | 2023–2024 | 14 | 0 | 19 | 0 | Scotland under-21 | — | | |
| Jimmy Prescott | FW | 1955–1956 | 18 | 5 | 18 | 5 | — | — | | |
| Peter Aitken | DF | 1982 | 18 | 2 | 18 | 2 | Wales under-23 | — | | |
| Anthony Shandran † | FW | 2003 | 18 | 3 | 18 | 3 | — | — | (Note: Burnley) | |
| Alex Rodman † | MF | 2012–2013 | 18 | 1 | 18 | 1 | England C | — | (Note: Aldershot Town) | |
| Jack O'Connell † | DF | 2013 | 18 | 0 | 18 | 0 | England under-19 | — | (Note: Blackburn Rovers) | |
| Kyle Cameron † | DF | 2016 | 18 | 1 | 18 | 1 | Scotland under-21 England under-16 | — | (Note: Newcastle United) | |
| Luke Hendrie † | DF | 2016 | 18 | 0 | 18 | 0 | England under-17 | — | | |
| George Precious | HB | 1928 | 17 | 0 | 18 | 0 | — | — | | |
| Mike Czuczman | DF | 1981–1982 | 17 | 0 | 18 | 0 | — | — | (Note: Grimsby Town) | |
| Jack McKay | FW | 2021–2022 | 17 | 3 | 18 | 3 | — | — | | |
| Junior Luamba † | MF | 2025 | 17 | 1 | 18 | 1 | — | — | (Note: Salford City) | |
| Alfie McNally * † | GK | 2026–present | 16 | 0 | 18 | 0 | — | — | (Note: Fulham) | |
| John Pearson | MF | 1965–1966 | 15 | 4 | 18 | 4 | England schools | — | | |
| Elliott Whitehouse † | MF | 2013 | 15 | 0 | 18 | 0 | England C | — | (Note: Sheffield United) | |
| Eddie Nolan | DF | 2015 | 15 | 1 | 18 | 1 | Republic of Ireland | 0 | | |
| Arthur Read * | MF | 2026–present | 15 | 1 | 18 | 1 | — | — | | |
| Dan Maguire | FW | 2019–2020 | 14 | 2 | 18 | 2 | England C | — | | |
| Richard Pacquette | FW | 2009–2010 | 13 | 1 | 18 | 4 | Dominica | 0 | | |
| Harry Moult | FW | 1922–1923 | 17 | 6 | 17 | 6 | — | — | | |
| Fred Springett | FB | 1938–1939 | 17 | 0 | 17 | 0 | — | — | | |
| John Battye | HB | 1959–1960 | 17 | 0 | 17 | 0 | — | — | | |
| Simon Brown † | MF | 2009 | 17 | 0 | 17 | 0 | — | — | (Note: Wrexham) | |
| Liam Darville | DF | 2011 | 17 | 0 | 17 | 0 | England under-17 | — | | |
| Harry Boyes * | DF | 2026–present | 16 | 2 | 17 | 2 | — | — | | |
| Jack Higgins | DF | 2016 | 15 | 0 | 17 | 0 | — | — | | |
| Reece Thompson | FW | 2015–2016 | 14 | 3 | 17 | 3 | — | — | | |
| Quévin Castro | MF | 2023–2024 | 14 | 1 | 17 | 1 | — | — | | |
| Robert Shanks | FB | 1926–1927 | 13 | 0 | 17 | 0 | — | — | | |
| Neil Smallwood | GK | 1986–1988 | 13 | 0 | 17 | 0 | — | — | | |
| Phil Kitching | MF | 1987–1988 | 13 | 0 | 17 | 0 | — | — | | |
| Mark Maley † | DF | 2001–2002 | 13 | 0 | 17 | 0 | England under-16 | — | (Note: Sunderland) | |
| Rory Watson | GK | 2023–2025 | 13 | 0 | 17 | 0 | — | — | | |
| Neil Campbell | FW | 1996–1997 | 12 | 1 | 17 | 1 | — | — | | |
| Trevor Wolstenholme | HB | 1966–1967 | 11 | 0 | 17 | 0 | — | — | | |
| Horrocks | GK | 1925–1926 | 16 | 0 | 16 | 0 | — | — | | |
| Terry Walker | FW | 1949–1950 | 16 | 9 | 16 | 9 | — | — | | |
| Bobby Olejnik † | GK | 2015 | 16 | 0 | 16 | 0 | Austria under-21 | — | (Note: Peterborough United) | |
| Sam Muggleton | DF | 2017 | 16 | 0 | 16 | 0 | — | — | | |
| Barry Tait | FW | 1959–1960 | 15 | 5 | 16 | 5 | — | — | | |
| David Joy | DF | 1967–1968 | 15 | 0 | 16 | 0 | England under-18 | — | | |
| Luke O'Neill † | DF | 2013–2014 | 15 | 1 | 16 | 1 | England under-17 | — | | |
| Bobby Hoy | MF | 1977 | 14 | 1 | 16 | 2 | England under-18 | — | | |
| Andy Curtis | MF | 1991; 1995 | 13 | 0 | 16 | 0 | — | — | | |
| Asa Hall † | MF | 2017 | 13 | 1 | 16 | 1 | England under-20 | — | (Note: Cheltenham Town) | |
| R. Holland | FW | 1925 | 12 | 11 | 16 | 17 | — | — | | |
| Chris Iwelumo † | FW | 2000 | 12 | 2 | 16 | 3 | Scotland | 0 | (Note: Stoke City) | |
| Josh King | DF | 2019–2021 | 12 | 1 | 16 | 1 | — | — | | |
| Harrison Hopper | MF | 2021–2022 | 11 | 0 | 16 | 0 | — | — | | |
| Sam Fielding | MF | 2016; 2021 | 10 | 0 | 16 | 0 | — | — | | |
| Jack Barnes | FW | 1934–1935 | 15 | 1 | 15 | 1 | — | — | | |
| George Little | FW | 1947–1948 | 15 | 2 | 15 | 2 | — | — | | |
| Steve Davis | DF | 2004 | 15 | 0 | 15 | 0 | — | — | | |
| Christian Smith | MF | 2009 | 15 | 2 | 15 | 2 | — | — | | |
| Mark Ellis † | DF | 2023 | 15 | 0 | 15 | 0 | — | — | (Note: Barrow) | |
| Scott Emmerson | FW | 2001–2002 | 14 | 1 | 15 | 1 | — | — | | |
| Lewis Richardson † | MF | 2025 | 14 | 4 | 15 | 4 | England under-17 | — | | |
| David Strain | FB | 1934 | 13 | 0 | 15 | 0 | — | — | | |
| Jon Maloney † | DF | 2005 | 13 | 4 | 15 | 4 | — | — | (Note: Doncaster Rovers) | |
| Callum Harriott | MF | 2023–2024 | 13 | 2 | 15 | 2 | Guyana; England under-19 | 0 | | |
| Malcolm Lang | MF | 1963 | 12 | 2 | 15 | 3 | — | — | | |
| Michael Staley | DF | 2004–2005 | 12 | 0 | 15 | 0 | — | — | | |
| Ben Godfrey | MF | 2015–2016 | 12 | 1 | 15 | 1 | England | 0 | | |
| Jake Cassidy | FW | 2020–2021 | 12 | 1 | 15 | 1 | Wales under-21 | — | | |
| James Nichol | FW | 1936–1937 | 11 | 3 | 15 | 4 | — | — | | |
| Liam Shepherd | MF | 2008–2009 | 11 | 0 | 15 | 0 | — | — | | |
| Jovan Malcolm * † | FW | 2026–present | 11 | 3 | 15 | 3 | — | — | (Note: Stevenage) | |
| Leonard Boot | GK | 1923 | 10 | 0 | 15 | 0 | — | — | | |
| Tommy Holmes | FB | 1922–1923 | 14 | 0 | 14 | 0 | — | — | | |
| Ted Richardson | FW | 1926 | 14 | 3 | 14 | 3 | — | — | | |
| Stuart Croft | DF | 1981 | 14 | 0 | 14 | 0 | — | — | | |
| Peter Hawkins † | DF | 2000 | 14 | 0 | 14 | 0 | — | — | (Note: Wimbledon) | |
| Steve Thomas | DF | 2006 | 14 | 1 | 14 | 1 | Wales under-21 | — | | |
| Danny Amos † | DF | 2024 | 14 | 0 | 14 | 0 | Northern Ireland under-21 | — | | |
| Fred Slater | FW | 1951 | 13 | 3 | 14 | 3 | — | — | | |
| Mick Gadsby | GK | 1969 | 13 | 0 | 14 | 0 | — | — | | |
| Arthur Turner | FB | 1934–1935 | 12 | 0 | 14 | 0 | — | — | | |
| Roy Ambler | FW | 1962–1963 | 12 | 3 | 14 | 3 | — | — | | |
| Paul Robinson | FW | 2004–2005 | 12 | 2 | 14 | 2 | — | — | | |
| David Tutonda † | DF | 2015 | 12 | 0 | 14 | 0 | — | — | (Note: Cardiff City) | |
| Jon Worsnop | GK | 2017 | 12 | 0 | 14 | 0 | — | — | | |
| Robbie Tinkler | DF | 2020–2021 | 12 | 0 | 14 | 0 | England C | — | | |
| Jason Goodliffe † | DF | 2006–2007 | 11 | 1 | 14 | 1 | England C | — | (Note: Stevenage Borough) | |
| Nathan Thomas | MF | 2022–2023 | 11 | 0 | 14 | 2 | — | — | | |
| Clarke Carlisle | DF | 2012 | 10 | 0 | 14 | 0 | England under-21 | — | | |
| Russell Howarth | GK | 1999–2002 | 8 | 0 | 14 | 0 | England under-20 | — | | |
| Les Slatter | FW | 1954–1955 | 13 | 0 | 13 | 0 | — | — | | |
| Stewart Ferebee | FW | 1979–1980 | 13 | 0 | 13 | 0 | — | — | | |
| Leo Fortune-West † | FW | 2008 | 13 | 2 | 13 | 2 | — | — | (Note: Cambridge United) | |
| Jim Coop | FW | 1949–1950 | 12 | 4 | 13 | 4 | — | — | | |
| Ally Millar | MF | 1980 | 12 | 0 | 13 | 0 | — | — | | |
| Anthony Ormerod † | MF | 1999 | 12 | 0 | 13 | 0 | England under-18 | — | | |
| Aidan O'Kane | MF | 2001–2002 | 12 | 0 | 13 | 0 | — | — | | |
| Gary Pearson | DF | 2004 | 12 | 0 | 13 | 0 | — | — | | |
| Alex Pattison † | MF | 2017–2018 | 12 | 0 | 13 | 0 | — | — | | |
| Harry Bunn | FW | 2020–2021 | 12 | 3 | 13 | 3 | — | — | | |
| Elliott Durrell | MF | 2019–2020 | 10 | 1 | 13 | 1 | — | — | | |
| Joe Ashley | GK | 1950–1951 | 9 | 0 | 13 | 0 | — | — | | |
| Alan Monkhouse | FW | 1956–1957 | 12 | 1 | 12 | 1 | — | — | | |
| Barry Pierce | FW | 1961–1962 | 12 | 5 | 12 | 5 | — | — | | |
| Bobby Cunliffe | FW | 1965–1966 | 12 | 2 | 12 | 2 | — | — | | |
| Gerry Sweeney | DF | 1982 | 12 | 0 | 12 | 0 | — | — | | |
| Mike Cook † | MF | 1987; 1990–1991 | 12 | 1 | 12 | 1 | — | — | (Note: Coventry City and Cambridge United) | |
| Greg Young | DF | 2010–2011 | 12 | 1 | 12 | 1 | — | — | | |
| Diego De Girolamo † | FW | 2014–2015 | 12 | 4 | 12 | 4 | Italy under-20 | — | | |
| Will Boyle † | DF | 2015–2016 | 12 | 0 | 12 | 0 | — | — | (Note: Huddersfield Town) | |
| Les Milner | FW | 1938–1939 | 11 | 4 | 12 | 4 | — | — | | |
| Josh Mimms | GK | 2008–2010 | 11 | 0 | 12 | 0 | — | — | | |
| Courtney Pitt † | MF | 2010 | 11 | 1 | 12 | 1 | — | — | | |
| Callum Rzonca | MF | 2015–2017 | 11 | 1 | 12 | 1 | — | — | | |
| Craig Hewitt * | MF | 2025–present | 11 | 1 | 12 | 1 | — | — | | |
| Charles Lawie | FW | 1935–1936 | 10 | 1 | 12 | 2 | — | — | | |
| Mark Atkins | MF | 1999 | 10 | 2 | 12 | 2 | England schools | — | | |
| Darryn Stamp † | FW | 2006–2007 | 10 | 0 | 12 | 0 | — | — | | |
| Daniel Rowe | DF | 2017–2018 | 10 | 1 | 12 | 1 | — | — | | |
| Daniel Kearns † | MF | 2012 | 9 | 0 | 12 | 0 | Republic of Ireland under-23 Northern Ireland under-19 | — | | |
| Frankie Maguire * | MF | 2026–present | 9 | 0 | 12 | 0 | — | — | | |
| John Peachey | FW | 1973–1974 | 8 | 3 | 12 | 4 | — | — | | |
| Brian Chippendale | MF | 1983–1985 | 8 | 0 | 12 | 1 | — | — | | |
| E. Walker | GK | 1923–1924 | 11 | 0 | 11 | 0 | — | — | | |
| Dick Thornton | GK | 1932 | 11 | 0 | 11 | 0 | — | — | | |
| George Maddison | GK | 1953–1954 | 11 | 0 | 11 | 0 | — | — | | |
| Alex Hamilton | HB | 1962 | 11 | 0 | 11 | 0 | — | — | | |
| John Coleman | HB | 1968–1969 | 11 | 3 | 11 | 3 | — | — | | |
| John Andrews | GK | 1969 | 11 | 0 | 11 | 0 | — | — | | |
| Mike De Placido | MF | 1972–1973 | 11 | 0 | 11 | 0 | England under-18 | — | | |
| Peter Swan | MF | 2000 | 11 | 0 | 11 | 0 | — | — | | |
| Michael Reddy † | FW | 2002–2003 | 11 | 2 | 11 | 2 | Republic of Ireland under-21 | — | | |
| Shaq Coulthirst † | FW | 2015 | 11 | 2 | 11 | 2 | England under-19 | — | | |
| Lewis Alessandra † | FW | 2016 | 11 | 2 | 11 | 2 | — | — | (Note: Rochdale) | |
| Scot Bennett † | U | 2016 | 11 | 0 | 11 | 0 | — | — | (Note: Notts County) | |
| Connor Brown | DF | 2018 | 11 | 0 | 11 | 0 | — | — | (Note: Guiseley) | |
| Jack Redshaw | FW | 2020–2021 | 10 | 1 | 11 | 2 | — | — | | |
| John Fielding | DF | 2001 | 9 | 1 | 11 | 1 | — | — | | |
| Steven Hogg | MF | 2008–2009 | 9 | 0 | 11 | 0 | — | — | | |
| Harry Spratt | DF | 2019–2020 | 9 | 0 | 11 | 0 | — | — | | |
| AJ Greaves | MF | 2022 | 9 | 0 | 11 | 0 | — | — | | |
| Jack Rutherford | HB | 1924 | 8 | 0 | 11 | 0 | — | — | | |
| John Harrison | DF | 1979–1980 | 8 | 0 | 11 | 0 | — | — | | |
| Moses Ashikodi | FW | 2011–2012 | 8 | 1 | 11 | 1 | Antigua and Barbuda; England under-19 | 0 | (Note: Kettering Town) | |
| Ben Gibson † | DF | 2012 | 8 | 0 | 11 | 0 | England under-21 | — | | |
| Sander Puri | MF | 2013–2014 | 8 | 0 | 11 | 0 | Estonia | 3 | | |
| Alex Bray † | MF | 2018–2019 | 8 | 0 | 11 | 1 | Wales under-19 | — | (Note: Rotherham United) | |
| Kyle Critchell † | DF | 2009 | 6 | 0 | 11 | 0 | Wales semi-pro | — | | |
| Zech Medley * | DF | 2026–present | 6 | 0 | 11 | 1 | England under-16 | — | | |
| Bob Thompson | FW | 1927 | 10 | 7 | 10 | 7 | — | — | | |
| Harold Young | FB | 1935–1937 | 10 | 0 | 10 | 0 | — | — | | |
| John Whitelaw | HB | 1937 | 10 | 4 | 10 | 4 | — | — | | |
| Austin Collier | HB | 1946 | 10 | 0 | 10 | 0 | — | — | | |
| Les Forster | FW | 1946–1947 | 10 | 2 | 10 | 2 | — | — | | |
| Charles Bradley | FW | 1946–1947 | 10 | 2 | 10 | 2 | — | — | | |
| Elijah Pyle | FW | 1947–1948 | 10 | 3 | 10 | 3 | — | — | | |
| Tony Collins | FW | 1949–1950 | 10 | 1 | 10 | 1 | — | — | | |
| Ken Morton | MF | 1965–1966 | 10 | 2 | 10 | 2 | England schools | — | | |
| Alan Kamara | DF | 1979 | 10 | 0 | 10 | 0 | — | — | | |
| Craig Skinner | MF | 1999–2000 | 10 | 0 | 10 | 0 | — | — | | |
| Andy Bell | FW | 2004 | 10 | 1 | 10 | 1 | England under-16 | — | | |
| Ben Jackson † | FW | 2005 | 10 | 0 | 10 | 0 | — | — | | |
| Alex Cisak † | GK | 2014–2015 | 10 | 0 | 10 | 0 | Australia under-20 | — | | |
| Ben Clappison | DF | 2016 | 10 | 0 | 10 | 0 | — | — | | |
| Raúl Correia † | FW | 2018 | 10 | 1 | 10 | 1 | — | — | (Note: Blackpool) | |
| Billy Yeats | FW | 1972–1973 | 9 | 0 | 10 | 0 | — | — | | |
| Steve Osborne | FW | 1991 | 9 | 0 | 10 | 0 | — | — | | |
| Lee Grant | DF | 2002; 2004–2005 | 9 | 2 | 10 | 2 | — | — | (Note: Aston Villa) | |
| Lee Andrews † | DF | 2005–2006 | 9 | 0 | 10 | 0 | — | — | (Note: Carlisle United) | |
| Rhys Turner † | FW | 2015 | 9 | 1 | 10 | 1 | — | — | (Note: Oldham Athletic) | |
| Joe Ironside † | FW | 2018–2019 | 9 | 0 | 10 | 0 | England C | — | (Note: Kidderminster Harriers) | |
| Luca Thomas † | MF | 2024 | 9 | 2 | 10 | 2 | — | — | (Note: Leeds United) | |
| Dave Stainwright | FW | 1969–1970 | 8 | 1 | 10 | 1 | — | — | | |
| Neil Woods | FW | 1998 | 8 | 0 | 10 | 0 | — | — | | |
| Craig James † | DF | 2007 | 8 | 0 | 10 | 0 | — | — | (Note: Darlington) | |
| Craig Clay | MF | 2013 | 8 | 0 | 10 | 0 | England C | — | | |
| Calvin Andrew | FW | 2014 | 8 | 1 | 10 | 1 | — | — | | |
| Hugh Atkinson | DF | 1984–1985 | 7 | 0 | 10 | 0 | Republic of Ireland under-21 | — | | |
| Steve Richards | DF | 1984–1985 | 7 | 0 | 10 | 0 | — | — | | |
| David Buchanan † | FW | 1987 | 7 | 2 | 10 | 3 | England C | — | | |
| Scott Brown | MF | 2012 | 7 | 0 | 10 | 0 | England under-19 | — | | |
| Michael Collins † | MF | 2015 | 7 | 0 | 10 | 0 | Republic of Ireland under-21 | — | (Note: Oxford United) | |
| Joe Davis † | DF | 2018–2019 | 7 | 0 | 10 | 0 | — | — | (Note: Port Vale) | |
| Jason Gilchrist | FW | 2021 | 7 | 0 | 10 | 0 | England C | — | (Note: South Shields) | |
| Ash Palmer * | DF | 2025–present | 7 | 0 | 10 | 0 | England C | — | | |
| Remy Longdon | MF | 2021–2022 | 6 | 0 | 10 | 0 | — | — | (Note: Lincoln City) | |
| Jack Hunt * | DF | 2026–present | 6 | 1 | 10 | 1 | — | — | | |
| Stan Dale | HB | 1923–1924 | 9 | 0 | 9 | 0 | — | — | | |
| Riley | FW | 1925–1926 | 9 | 7 | 9 | 7 | — | — | | |
| Jack Everest | FW | 1926–1928 | 9 | 4 | 9 | 4 | — | — | | |
| Ernie Robinson | FB | 1927–1929 | 9 | 0 | 9 | 0 | — | — | | |
| Bobby Turner | HB | 1934–1935 | 9 | 0 | 9 | 0 | — | — | | |
| Stanley Milton | GK | 1938–1939 | 9 | 0 | 9 | 0 | — | — | | |
| Charlie Ware | FW | 1953–1954 | 9 | 0 | 9 | 0 | — | — | | |
| Tom Brownlee | FW | 1958–1959 | 9 | 2 | 9 | 2 | — | — | | |
| Graham Caulfield | FW | 1967 | 9 | 2 | 9 | 2 | — | — | | |
| Peter Bainbridge | DF | 1978 | 9 | 0 | 9 | 0 | — | — | | |
| Dave Gilbert † | MF | 1997 | 9 | 1 | 9 | 1 | — | — | (Note: West Bromwich Albion) | |
| Justin Walker † | MF | 2004 | 9 | 0 | 9 | 0 | England under-18 | — | | |
| Rob Elvins † | FW | 2007 | 9 | 0 | 9 | 0 | — | — | | |
| Paul Harsley † | MF | 2010 | 9 | 1 | 9 | 1 | — | — | (Note: Chesterfield) | |
| John McGrath † | MF | 2013 | 9 | 0 | 9 | 0 | Republic of Ireland under-21 | — | (Note: Burton Albion) | |
| Mal Benning † | DF | 2015 | 9 | 0 | 9 | 0 | — | — | (Note: Walsall) | |
| Scott Loach † | GK | 2017 | 9 | 0 | 9 | 0 | England C | — | | |
| Chris Beardsley | FW | 2007 | 8 | 0 | 9 | 0 | — | — | | |
| Alan Ogden | DF | 1974–1975 | 7 | 0 | 9 | 0 | — | — | | |
| Simon Lappin | MF | 2016–2017 | 7 | 0 | 9 | 0 | Scotland under-21 | — | | |
| Theo Wharton | MF | 2017–2018 | 7 | 0 | 9 | 0 | Saint Kitts and Nevis; Wales under-21 | 3 | | |
| Kieran Kennedy | DF | 2020 | 7 | 0 | 9 | 0 | England under-19 | — | | |
| Mo Fadera | FW | 2024–2025 | 7 | 0 | 9 | 0 | — | — | | |
| David Ajiboye † | MF | 2024–2025 | 7 | 1 | 9 | 2 | — | — | | |
| Darren Patterson | DF | 2000–2001 | 6 | 0 | 9 | 0 | Northern Ireland | 0 | | |
| Lewis Hawkins † | MF | 2018 | 6 | 0 | 9 | 1 | — | — | (Note: Hartlepool United) | |
| Kevin Gall | MF / FW | 2009–2010 | 5 | 1 | 9 | 1 | Wales under-21 | — | | |
| Tom Smiles | FW | 1929–1930 | 8 | 0 | 8 | 0 | — | — | | |
| George Denholm | HB | 1936–1939 | 8 | 0 | 8 | 0 | — | — | | |
| Arnold Hamer | FB | 1938 | 8 | 0 | 8 | 0 | — | — | | |
| Edouard Wojtczak | GK | 1946–1947 | 8 | 0 | 8 | 0 | — | — | | |
| Ron Thompson | FW | 1949–1950 | 8 | 0 | 8 | 0 | — | — | | |
| Ken Whiteside | FW | 1954–1955 | 8 | 0 | 8 | 0 | — | — | | |
| Brian Jordan | HB | 1960 | 8 | 0 | 8 | 0 | — | — | | |
| Paul Maloney | MF | 1970–1972 | 8 | 0 | 8 | 0 | — | — | | |
| Shaun Weatherhead | DF | 1990–1991 | 8 | 0 | 8 | 0 | — | — | | |
| Marc Salvati | MF | 2001 | 8 | 1 | 8 | 1 | — | — | | |
| Jon Shaw † | FW | 2003 | 8 | 0 | 8 | 0 | England C | — | (Note: Sheffield Wednesday) | |
| János Kovács † | DF | 2007 | 8 | 1 | 8 | 1 | Hungary under-19 | — | | |
| Carlton Morris † | FW | 2014–2015 | 8 | 0 | 8 | 0 | England under-19 | — | (Note: Norwich City) | |
| Percy Dennis | FW | 1923; 1926 | 7 | 0 | 8 | 0 | — | — | | |
| Jimmy Graham | FW | 1935 | 7 | 0 | 8 | 0 | — | — | | |
| Jeff Birch | FW | 1949 | 7 | 0 | 8 | 0 | — | — | | |
| Neil Tarrant † | FW | 2000 | 7 | 1 | 8 | 1 | Scotland under-21 | — | | |
| Craig Wilding | FW | 2002–2003 | 7 | 0 | 8 | 0 | — | — | | |
| Lee Cook † | MF | 2002 | 7 | 1 | 8 | 2 | — | — | | |
| Craig Nelthorpe | MF | 2009 | 7 | 0 | 8 | 0 | — | — | | |
| Jamie Clarke | MF | 2010 | 7 | 0 | 8 | 0 | — | — | | |
| Jassem Sukar | DF | 2017 | 7 | 0 | 8 | 0 | — | — | | |
| John Kelly | FW | 1930–1931 | 6 | 4 | 8 | 5 | — | — | | |
| David Longhurst | FW | 1990 | 6 | 2 | 8 | 2 | — | — | | |
| Wayne Osborne | DF | 1995 | 6 | 0 | 8 | 0 | — | — | | |
| Aron Wilford | FW | 2003 | 6 | 2 | 8 | 2 | — | — | | |
| Reon Potts | FW | 2020 | 6 | 0 | 8 | 0 | — | — | | |
| Olly Green † | MF | 2023 | 6 | 0 | 8 | 0 | — | — | | |
| Robbie Weir † | MF | 2010–2011 | 5 | 0 | 8 | 0 | Northern Ireland B | — | | |
| Paddy Robbins | FW | 1945–1946 | 0 | 0 | 8 | 1 | — | — | | |
| Arthur Lickley | HB | 1922 | 7 | 0 | 7 | 0 | — | — | | |
| F. Roberts | GK | 1924 | 7 | 0 | 7 | 0 | — | — | | |
| Jimmy Bolton | HB | 1932 | 7 | 0 | 7 | 0 | — | — | | |
| Joe Duckworth | GK | 1932 | 7 | 0 | 7 | 0 | — | — | | |
| Bert Williams | FW | 1932–1933 | 7 | 0 | 7 | 0 | Wales | 0 | | |
| Billy Clayson | FW | 1933–1934 | 7 | 0 | 7 | 0 | — | — | | |
| Frank Carr | FW | 1946–1947 | 7 | 3 | 7 | 3 | — | — | | |
| Ernie Nettleton | FW | 1946–1947 | 7 | 2 | 7 | 2 | — | — | | |
| Maurice McDermott | FB | 1947 | 7 | 0 | 7 | 0 | — | — | | |
| Gus Alexander | HB | 1959–1960 | 7 | 0 | 7 | 0 | — | — | | |
| David Morris † | FW | 1977 | 7 | 0 | 7 | 0 | — | — | (Note: Manchester United) | |
| Lee Rogers † | DF | 1988 | 7 | 0 | 7 | 0 | — | — | (Note: Bristol City) | |
| Kieron Durkan † | MF | 2000 | 7 | 0 | 7 | 0 | Republic of Ireland under-21 | — | (Note: Macclesfield Town) | |
| Keith Graydon † | FW | 2003 | 7 | 1 | 7 | 1 | Republic of Ireland under-20 | — | | |
| Jon Newby † | FW | 2004 | 7 | 0 | 7 | 0 | — | — | | |
| Alex Meechan | MF | 2007 | 7 | 1 | 7 | 1 | — | — | | |
| Stephen Henderson † | GK | 2007 | 7 | 0 | 7 | 0 | Republic of Ireland under-21 | — | | |
| Duane Courtney | DF | 2010 | 7 | 0 | 7 | 0 | — | — | | |
| David Mirfin † | DF | 2019 | 7 | 0 | 7 | 0 | — | — | (Note: Mansfield Town) | |
| Aiden Marsh † | FW | 2023 | 7 | 0 | 7 | 0 | — | — | (Note: Barnsley) | |
| Arthur Bullock | FW | 1934–1935 | 6 | 0 | 7 | 0 | England schools | — | | |
| Liam Henderson | FW | 2011–2012 | 6 | 1 | 7 | 1 | — | — | | |
| Kennedy Digie † | DF | 2018 | 6 | 0 | 7 | 0 | — | — | | |
| Ollie Tanner † | MF | 2023 | 6 | 0 | 7 | 0 | — | — | | |
| Ryan Mallon | FW | 2005 | 5 | 0 | 7 | 0 | — | — | | |
| Luke Foster † | DF | 2006 | 5 | 0 | 7 | 0 | England C | — | | |
| Drew | FB | 1925–1926 | 4 | 0 | 7 | 0 | — | — | | |
| Oli Johnson | FW | 2012 | 4 | 0 | 7 | 0 | — | — | | |
| A.S. Pattie | FW | 1923–1924 | 6 | 1 | 6 | 1 | — | — | | |
| Carl Hooper | FW | 1927 | 6 | 2 | 6 | 2 | — | — | | |
| Ernie Simms | FW | 1928 | 6 | 2 | 6 | 2 | England | 0 | | |
| Lacy | FW | 1928–1929 | 6 | 3 | 6 | 3 | — | — | | |
| Albert Bonass | FW | 1933–1934 | 6 | 0 | 6 | 0 | — | — | | |
| Jackie Slicer | FW | 1933 | 6 | 0 | 6 | 0 | — | — | | |
| Joe Firth | FW | 1938 | 6 | 1 | 6 | 1 | — | — | | |
| David Meechan | FW | 1963 | 6 | 0 | 6 | 0 | — | — | | |
| Tom Sweenie | MF | 1968 | 6 | 1 | 6 | 1 | — | — | | |
| Brian Thompson † | FW | 1973 | 6 | 0 | 6 | 0 | England C | — | | |
| John Lowey † | MF / FW | 1987 | 6 | 0 | 6 | 0 | — | — | (Note: Wigan Athletic) | |
| Mike Stowell † | GK | 1987–1988 | 6 | 0 | 6 | 0 | — | — | (Note: Everton) | |
| Richard Crossley | DF | 1990–1991 | 6 | 0 | 6 | 0 | — | — | | |
| Martin Carruthers † | FW | 1999 | 6 | 0 | 6 | 0 | — | — | | |
| Paul Talbot | MF | 2000 | 6 | 0 | 6 | 0 | — | — | | |
| Marlon Beresford | GK | 2002 | 6 | 0 | 6 | 0 | — | — | | |
| Stephen Downes | MF | 2003–2004 | 6 | 0 | 6 | 0 | — | — | | |
| Gary Browne | FW | 2003 | 6 | 0 | 6 | 0 | Northern Ireland under-21 | — | | |
| Niall Henderson | MF | 2008 | 6 | 0 | 6 | 0 | — | — | | |
| Ryan Brunt † | FW | 2014 | 6 | 0 | 6 | 0 | — | — | | |
| Shaun Miller † | FW | 2015 | 6 | 0 | 6 | 0 | — | — | (Note: Coventry City) | |
| Ľubomír Šatka † | DF | 2016 | 6 | 0 | 6 | 0 | Slovakia | 0 | | |
| Robbie McDaid | FW | 2016 | 6 | 0 | 6 | 0 | Northern Ireland under-21 | — | | |
| Finlay Barnes | MF | 2024 | 6 | 0 | 6 | 0 | — | — | | |
| Jock Wightman | HB | 1933–1934 | 5 | 0 | 6 | 0 | — | — | | |
| Adrian Shaw | MF | 1988 | 5 | 0 | 6 | 0 | — | — | | |
| Andy Gosney † | GK | 1991 | 5 | 0 | 6 | 0 | England under-20 | — | (Note: Portsmouth) | |
| David Rush | FW | 1997 | 5 | 0 | 6 | 0 | — | — | | |
| Matthew Coad | MF | 2003–2004 | 5 | 0 | 6 | 0 | — | — | | |
| Leo Bertos | MF | 2005–2006 | 5 | 0 | 6 | 0 | New Zealand | 0 | | |
| Rhys Murphy † | FW | 2016–2017 | 5 | 0 | 6 | 2 | Republic of Ireland under-21 England under-19 | — | (Note: Forest Green Rovers) | |
| Roger Eli | MF | 1988 | 4 | 1 | 6 | 1 | — | — | | |
| Russell Fry | MF | 2007–2008 | 4 | 0 | 6 | 0 | England under-20 Wales under-16 | — | | |
| Kieran Wallace † | MF | 2021 | 4 | 0 | 6 | 0 | England under-17 | — | | |
| C. Lucas | FW | 1923 | 5 | 1 | 5 | 1 | — | — | | |
| Harold Jones | HB | 1923–1924; 1928 | 5 | 1 | 5 | 1 | — | — | | |
| Harry Flanaghan | FW | 1924 | 5 | 0 | 5 | 0 | — | — | | |
| P. Barnicle | GK | 1926 | 5 | 0 | 5 | 0 | — | — | | |
| Eugeniusz Kubicki | FW | 1946 | 5 | 0 | 5 | 0 | Poland | 0 | | |
| Bobby Browne | HB | 1947 | 5 | 0 | 5 | 0 | Ireland | 0 | | |
| Ron Peart | HB | 1948 | 5 | 0 | 5 | 0 | — | — | | |
| Brian Woodward | FW | 1950–1951 | 5 | 0 | 5 | 0 | — | — | | |
| Ron Barritt | FW | 1952–1953 | 5 | 0 | 5 | 0 | — | — | | |
| John Shepherd | MF / FW | 1968–1969 | 5 | 0 | 5 | 0 | — | — | | |
| Chris Dale | MF | 1968 | 5 | 0 | 5 | 0 | — | — | | |
| Bobby Bell | DF | 1977 | 5 | 0 | 5 | 0 | — | — | | |
| Graham Collier | MF | 1978 | 5 | 0 | 5 | 0 | — | — | | |
| Graeme Hedley † | MF | 1981 | 5 | 1 | 5 | 1 | — | — | | |
| Gerry Fell † | MF | 1982 | 5 | 0 | 5 | 0 | — | — | | |
| Kieran Darlow | MF | 2000–2001 | 5 | 0 | 5 | 0 | — | — | | |
| Dean Crowe † | FW | 2003 | 5 | 0 | 5 | 0 | — | — | (Note: Luton Town) | |
| Chris Clarke | DF | 2004 | 5 | 0 | 5 | 0 | — | — | | |
| Kyle Armstrong | DF | 2005 | 5 | 0 | 5 | 0 | — | — | | |
| Darren Mansaram † | FW | 2005 | 5 | 0 | 5 | 0 | — | — | (Note: Halifax Town) | |
| Peter Holmes † | MF | 2008 | 5 | 1 | 5 | 1 | England under-16 | — | | |
| David Dowson | FW | 2010 | 5 | 0 | 5 | 0 | — | — | | |
| Aaron McCarey † | GK | 2013 | 5 | 0 | 5 | 0 | Republic of Ireland under-21 | — | (Note: Wolverhampton Wanderers) | |
| Josh Robinson | DF | 2016 | 5 | 0 | 5 | 0 | Northern Ireland under-21 | — | | |
| Justin Johnson † | MF | 2016 | 5 | 0 | 5 | 0 | — | — | (Note: Dundee United) | |
| Charlie Cooper † | MF | 2016 | 5 | 0 | 5 | 0 | — | — | (Note: Birmingham City) | |
| Liam Agnew † | MF | 2018–2019 | 5 | 0 | 5 | 0 | — | — | (Note: Harrogate Town) | |
| Keith Newman | HB | 1970 | 4 | 0 | 5 | 0 | England schools | — | | |
| Jimmy Crangle | MF | 1972–1973 | 4 | 0 | 5 | 0 | — | — | | |
| Paul Taylor | MF | 1973 | 4 | 0 | 5 | 0 | — | — | | |
| Neil Warnock | MF | 1978 | 4 | 0 | 5 | 0 | — | — | | |
| Warren Ward | FW | 1984–1985 | 4 | 3 | 5 | 3 | — | — | | |
| Nigel Costello | MF | 1987–1988 | 4 | 0 | 5 | 0 | — | — | | |
| Rogério Carvalho | FW | 2002 | 4 | 0 | 5 | 0 | — | — | | |
| Evan Horwood † | DF | 2005 | 4 | 0 | 5 | 0 | — | — | | |
| Charlie Taylor † | DF | 2012 | 4 | 0 | 5 | 0 | England under-19 | — | | |
| Jason Mooney | GK | 2014 | 4 | 0 | 5 | 0 | — | — | | |
| George Swan | DF | 2015 | 4 | 0 | 5 | 0 | — | — | | |
| Aarran Racine † | DF | 2016–2017 | 4 | 1 | 5 | 1 | — | — | | |
| Darragh O'Connor | DF | 2024–2025 | 4 | 0 | 5 | 0 | — | — | | |
| David Jones | MF | 1970 | 3 | 0 | 5 | 0 | — | — | | |
| Rory Prendergast | MF | 1998 | 3 | 0 | 5 | 0 | — | — | | |
| Ben Hirst | FW | 2014 | 3 | 0 | 5 | 0 | — | — | | |
| Paul Brough | FW | 1987 | 1 | 0 | 5 | 0 | — | — | | |
| Alf Young | HB | 1945–1946 | 0 | 0 | 5 | 0 | England | 0 | | |
| Wilf Bowe | FW | 1922–1925 | 4 | 2 | 4 | 2 | — | — | | |
| Ted Appleton | FW | 1923–1924 | 4 | 0 | 4 | 0 | — | — | | |
| Bob Cross | FW | 1924 | 4 | 0 | 4 | 0 | — | — | | |
| Thirlbeck | FB | 1924 | 4 | 0 | 4 | 0 | — | — | | |
| George Martindale | FB | 1926 | 4 | 0 | 4 | 0 | — | — | | |
| James Aitken | FW | 1930–1931 | 4 | 1 | 4 | 1 | — | — | | |
| Cliff Johnson | FW | 1935 | 4 | 2 | 4 | 2 | — | — | | |
| Alec Gray | FW | 1935–1936 | 4 | 1 | 4 | 1 | — | — | | |
| Bert Flatley | FW | 1939 | 4 | 0 | 4 | 0 | — | — | | |
| Charlie Woollett | FW | 1949 | 4 | 0 | 4 | 0 | — | — | | |
| Harry Daniels | HB | 1950 | 4 | 2 | 4 | 2 | — | — | | |
| Arthur Wheat | FW | 1952–1953 | 4 | 0 | 4 | 0 | — | — | | |
| Mike Ryan | FW | 1953 | 4 | 0 | 4 | 0 | — | — | | |
| Robert Bainbridge | FW | 1954–1955 | 4 | 0 | 4 | 0 | — | — | | |
| Roy Tunks † | GK | 1969 | 4 | 0 | 4 | 0 | — | — | | |
| Tommy Thompson | DF | 1970 | 4 | 0 | 4 | 0 | Great Britain; England amateur | — | | |
| Alan Murray † | MF | 1972 | 4 | 0 | 4 | 0 | — | — | | |
| Ian Robb | DF | 1974–1975 | 4 | 0 | 4 | 0 | — | — | | |
| Mick Coop † | DF | 1974 | 4 | 0 | 4 | 0 | — | — | | |
| Peter Creamer † | DF | 1975 | 4 | 0 | 4 | 0 | England schools | — | | |
| Neil Morris | FW | 1988 | 4 | 0 | 4 | 0 | — | — | | |
| Craig Madden | FW | 1990 | 4 | 0 | 4 | 0 | — | — | | |
| Steve Lister † | DF | 1991 | 4 | 1 | 4 | 1 | — | — | (Note: Scunthorpe United) | |
| Richard Offiong † | FW | 2004 | 4 | 0 | 4 | 0 | England under-20 | — | | |
| Adam Arthur | FW | 2004 | 4 | 0 | 4 | 0 | — | — | | |
| Kane Ashcroft | MF | 2004 | 4 | 0 | 4 | 0 | — | — | | |
| Paul Crichton | GK | 2004 | 4 | 0 | 4 | 0 | — | — | | |
| Jimmy Beadle | MF | 2008 | 4 | 0 | 4 | 0 | — | — | | |
| Peter Bore † | MF | 2008 | 4 | 0 | 4 | 0 | — | — | | |
| Will Hatfield † | MF | 2011 | 4 | 0 | 4 | 0 | — | — | | |
| John McReady | MF | 2012–2013 | 4 | 0 | 4 | 0 | — | — | | |
| Danny Blanchett | DF | 2012 | 4 | 0 | 4 | 0 | — | — | | |
| David McDaid | FW | 2013 | 4 | 0 | 4 | 0 | Republic of Ireland under-19 Northern Ireland schools | — | | |
| Curtis Obeng † | DF / MF | 2013 | 4 | 0 | 4 | 0 | England C | — | (Note: Swansea City) | |
| Stefan O'Connor † | DF | 2015–2016 | 4 | 0 | 4 | 0 | England under-17 | — | (Note: Arsenal) | |
| Derek Riordan | FW | 2016 | 4 | 0 | 4 | 0 | Scotland | 0 | | |
| Bailey Peacock-Farrell † | GK | 2017 | 4 | 0 | 4 | 0 | Northern Ireland | 0 | | |
| Vinnie Steels | MF | 2018 | 4 | 0 | 4 | 0 | — | — | | |
| Jaden Charles † | DF | 2021 | 4 | 0 | 4 | 0 | Republic of Ireland under-18 | — | | |
| Adam Senior † | DF | 2021 | 4 | 0 | 4 | 0 | — | — | (Note: Bolton Wanderers) | |
| Scott Boden | FW | 2022 | 4 | 0 | 4 | 0 | — | — | | |
| Danny Rowe † | FW | 2023 | 4 | 0 | 4 | 0 | — | — | | |
| Levi Andoh | DF | 2023 | 4 | 0 | 4 | 0 | — | — | | |
| Charlie Allen † | MF | 2024 | 4 | 0 | 4 | 0 | Northern Ireland under-21 | — | | |
| Arthur Kay | FB | 1923–1924 | 3 | 0 | 4 | 0 | — | — | | |
| Billy Ellis | FW | 1930 | 3 | 1 | 4 | 1 | — | — | | |
| Alan Waldron | MF | 1981 | 3 | 1 | 4 | 1 | — | — | | |
| Mick Heathcote † | DF | 1990 | 3 | 0 | 4 | 0 | — | — | | |
| Kevin Dixon † | MF | 1999 | 3 | 0 | 4 | 0 | England under-18 | — | | |
| James Okoli | DF | 2002 | 3 | 0 | 4 | 0 | — | — | | |
| Gerry Harrison | MF | 2004 | 3 | 0 | 4 | 0 | England schools | — | | |
| Terry Barwick † | MF | 2005 | 3 | 0 | 4 | 0 | — | — | | |
| Erik Tønne † | MF | 2012 | 3 | 1 | 4 | 1 | — | — | | |
| Bryn Morris † | MF | 2015 | 3 | 0 | 4 | 0 | England under-20 | — | | |
| Luke Simpson | GK | 2016–2017 | 3 | 0 | 4 | 0 | — | — | | |
| Gary Martin | FW | 2017 | 3 | 0 | 4 | 1 | — | — | | |
| Sean McAllister † | MF | 2017–2018 | 3 | 0 | 4 | 0 | — | — | | |
| Rob Guilfoyle | FW | 2020–2021 | 3 | 1 | 4 | 1 | — | — | | |
| Kyle McFarlane | FW | 2019 | 2 | 0 | 4 | 1 | — | — | | |
| Luke Daley † | DF | 2023 | 2 | 0 | 4 | 0 | — | — | | |
| Edward Bentall | HB | 1949–1950 | 1 | 0 | 4 | 0 | — | — | | |
| Ben Poole | FB | 1945 | 0 | 0 | 4 | 0 | — | — | | |
| Harry Thompson | FW | 1946 | 0 | 0 | 4 | 0 | — | — | | |
| Jack Quinlan | FW | 1923 | 3 | 0 | 3 | 0 | — | — | | |
| C.H. Allison | FW | 1923 | 3 | 0 | 3 | 0 | — | — | | |
| Richards | HB | 1926 | 3 | 2 | 3 | 2 | — | — | | |
| Sam Gallacher | FW | 1929 | 3 | 0 | 3 | 0 | — | — | | |
| Bob Tomlinson | FW | 1930 | 3 | 1 | 3 | 1 | — | — | | |
| Wilf Burrows | GK | 1933–1934 | 3 | 0 | 3 | 0 | — | — | | |
| Alfred Robinson | FW | 1936 | 3 | 0 | 3 | 0 | — | — | | |
| George Craven | GK | 1936 | 3 | 0 | 3 | 0 | — | — | | |
| Wally Reynolds | FW | 1938 | 3 | 0 | 3 | 0 | — | — | | |
| Jeff Pears | GK | 1948–1949 | 3 | 0 | 3 | 0 | — | — | | |
| Ernie Burton | FW | 1948 | 3 | 0 | 3 | 0 | — | — | | |
| Alick Grant | GK | 1950 | 3 | 0 | 3 | 0 | — | — | | |
| Peter Tait | FW | 1955 | 3 | 1 | 3 | 1 | — | — | | |
| Dick Steel | FB | 1956–1958 | 3 | 0 | 3 | 0 | — | — | | |
| Terry Stoddart | HB | 1956 | 3 | 0 | 3 | 0 | England schools | — | | |
| John Metcalfe | FW | 1957 | 3 | 2 | 3 | 2 | — | — | | |
| William Povey | MF | 1964 | 3 | 0 | 3 | 0 | — | — | | |
| Ian Burden | FW | 1966 | 3 | 2 | 3 | 2 | — | — | | |
| Don Burluraux † | MF | 1971–1972 | 3 | 1 | 3 | 1 | — | — | | |
| Barrie Mitchell | FW | 1977 | 3 | 0 | 3 | 0 | — | — | | |
| Steven Murray † | MF | 1986 | 3 | 0 | 3 | 0 | Scotland under-19 | — | (Note: Nottingham Forest) | |
| David Spofforth | DF | 1987–1988 | 3 | 0 | 3 | 0 | — | — | | |
| Richard Ord † | DF | 1990 | 3 | 0 | 3 | 0 | England under-21 | — | | |
| John Keegan | DF | 1999 | 3 | 0 | 3 | 0 | — | — | | |
| Nicolás Mazzina | MF | 2002 | 3 | 0 | 3 | 0 | — | — | | |
| Robbie Haw | MF | 2004 | 3 | 0 | 3 | 0 | — | — | | |
| Jermaine Palmer † | FW | 2005 | 3 | 0 | 3 | 0 | — | — | | |
| Tcham N'Toya † | FW | 2006 | 3 | 0 | 3 | 0 | — | — | | |
| Michael Maidens † | MF | 2007 | 3 | 0 | 3 | 0 | — | — | | |
| Joey Hutchinson | MF | 2007 | 3 | 0 | 3 | 0 | — | — | | |
| Mark Beesley † | FW | 2010 | 3 | 0 | 3 | 0 | — | — | (Note: Fleetwood Town) | |
| Paul Musselwhite | GK | 2012 | 3 | 0 | 3 | 0 | — | — | (Note: Musselwhite is the oldest player to play for the club in a competitive match; on his last appearance, a 1–0 victory over Forest Green Rovers on 28 April 2012, he was 43 years and 127 days old.) | |
| George Taft † | DF | 2013 | 3 | 0 | 3 | 0 | England under-19 | — | (Note: Leicester City) | |
| Josh O'Hanlon † | FW | 2015 | 3 | 0 | 3 | 0 | — | — | (Note: AFC Bournemouth) | |
| Ntumba Massanka † | FW | 2016 | 3 | 0 | 3 | 0 | — | — | | |
| Flynn McNaughton | FW | 2018 | 3 | 0 | 3 | 0 | — | — | | |
| Fergus McAughtrie | MF | 2018 | 3 | 0 | 3 | 0 | — | — | | |
| Tom Bradbury † | DF | 2019 | 3 | 0 | 3 | 0 | — | — | (Note: Dundee) | |
| Jasper Moon † | DF | 2019 | 3 | 0 | 3 | 0 | — | — | | |
| Sam Jones † | FW | 2020 | 3 | 0 | 3 | 0 | Wales under-19 | — | | |
| Sam Fishburn † | FW | 2024 | 3 | 0 | 3 | 0 | — | — | | |
| Reg Stockill | FW | 1929–1930 | 2 | 1 | 3 | 1 | England schools | — | (Note: Stockill is the youngest player to play for the club in a competitive match; on his debut, a 2–0 victory over Wigan Borough on 29 August 1929, he was 15 years and 281 days old.) | |
| Jimmy Hartnett | FW | 1958 | 2 | 0 | 3 | 0 | Republic of Ireland | 0 | | |
| Tony Moore | FW | 1962 | 2 | 0 | 3 | 0 | — | — | | |
| Ian Wolstenholme | GK | 1964–1965 | 2 | 0 | 3 | 0 | England amateur | — | | |
| Scott Oxley | MF | 1995–1996 | 2 | 0 | 3 | 0 | — | — | | |
| Sam Duncum † | MF | 2008 | 2 | 0 | 3 | 0 | — | — | | |
| Bruce Dyer | FW | 2008 | 2 | 0 | 3 | 0 | England under-21 | — | | |
| Ben Swallow | MF | 2012 | 2 | 0 | 3 | 0 | Wales semi-pro | — | | |
| Luke Woodland | MF | 2016–2017 | 2 | 0 | 3 | 0 | Philippines; England under-18 | 0 | | |
| Adam Buxton † | DF | 2020 | 2 | 0 | 3 | 0 | — | — | (Note: Morecambe) | |
| Martin Reagan | FW | 1945–1946 | 1 | 0 | 3 | 0 | — | — | | |
| Alex Rhodes | FW | 2006–2007 | 1 | 0 | 3 | 0 | — | — | | |
| Gavin Rothery | MF | 2008 | 1 | 0 | 3 | 0 | England under-19 | — | | |
| Charlie McArthur * | DF | 2026–present | 1 | 0 | 3 | 0 | Scotland under-21 | — | | |
| Jack Mahon | FW | 1946 | 0 | 0 | 3 | 0 | — | — | | |
| Phil Turnbull | MF | 2008 | 0 | 0 | 3 | 0 | — | — | | |
| Lewis Beadle * | DF | 2026–present | 0 | 0 | 3 | 0 | — | — | | |
| Ollie Belleh * | MF | 2026–present | 0 | 0 | 3 | 0 | — | — | | |
| Ben Farrar * | FW | 2026–present | 0 | 0 | 3 | 0 | — | — | | |
| Ethan Stiver * | MF | 2026–present | 0 | 0 | 3 | 0 | — | — | | |
| George Harron | FW | 1922 | 2 | 0 | 2 | 0 | — | — | | |
| J. Tindall | FW | 1924 | 2 | 0 | 2 | 0 | — | — | | |
| Fred Kay | FW | 1924–1926 | 2 | 0 | 2 | 0 | — | — | | |
| Hewitt | FW | 1925 | 2 | 0 | 2 | 0 | — | — | | |
| Bob Sandiford | FW | 1925 | 2 | 0 | 2 | 0 | — | — | | |
| Stonehouse | FW | 1926 | 2 | 1 | 2 | 1 | — | — | | |
| Thomas Hill | HB | 1927–1928 | 2 | 0 | 2 | 0 | — | — | | |
| Jock Collier | HB | 1928 | 2 | 0 | 2 | 0 | — | — | | |
| Houghton | FW | 1928 | 2 | 0 | 2 | 0 | — | — | | |
| Syd Glidden | FW | 1929 | 2 | 0 | 2 | 0 | — | — | | |
| Walter Camidge | FW | 1932–1933 | 2 | 0 | 2 | 0 | — | — | | |
| William Moore | FW | 1933 | 2 | 0 | 2 | 0 | — | — | | |
| William Whitelaw | FW | 1934 | 2 | 0 | 2 | 0 | — | — | | |
| William Tucker | FW | 1935 | 2 | 1 | 2 | 1 | — | — | | |
| Bill Hewitson | FW | 1936 | 2 | 1 | 2 | 1 | — | — | | |
| Jimmy Carr | FW | 1938 | 2 | 2 | 2 | 2 | — | — | | |
| Jack Price | FW | 1948–1949 | 2 | 2 | 2 | 2 | — | — | | |
| Colin Longden | FW | 1957 | 2 | 0 | 2 | 0 | England schools | — | | |
| Jeff Barmby | FW | 1963 | 2 | 0 | 2 | 0 | — | — | | |
| Gerry Coyne | FW | 1966 | 2 | 0 | 2 | 0 | — | — | | |
| Stewart Fellows | HB | 1967–1968 | 2 | 0 | 2 | 0 | — | — | | |
| John Woodall | FW | 1968 | 2 | 0 | 2 | 0 | — | — | | |
| Alan Smith | MF | 1970–1971 | 2 | 0 | 2 | 0 | — | — | | |
| Kenny Wilson † | FW | 1973 | 2 | 0 | 2 | 0 | — | — | | |
| Stuart Walker | GK | 1976 | 2 | 0 | 2 | 0 | — | — | | |
| Richard Taylor † | GK | 1980 | 2 | 0 | 2 | 0 | England under-18 | — | | |
| Tim Hotte † | FW | 1988 | 2 | 0 | 2 | 0 | — | — | | |
| Gary Hurlstone | FW | 1989 | 2 | 0 | 2 | 0 | — | — | | |
| Graham Cooper † | MF | 1990 | 2 | 0 | 2 | 0 | — | — | | |
| Paul Shepstone † | MF | 1992 | 2 | 0 | 2 | 0 | England under-16 | — | | |
| Nicky Scaife | MF | 1995 | 2 | 0 | 2 | 0 | — | — | | |
| Mark Prudhoe † | GK | 1997 | 2 | 0 | 2 | 0 | — | — | | |
| Steve Davis † | DF | 1997 | 2 | 1 | 2 | 1 | England under-18 | — | | |
| Michael Evans | MF | 2001 | 2 | 0 | 2 | 0 | — | — | | |
| Phil Whitehead † | GK | 2003 | 2 | 0 | 2 | 0 | — | — | (Note: Reading) | |
| Jonjo Dickman † | MF | 2004 | 2 | 0 | 2 | 0 | — | — | | |
| Robert Constable † | MF | 2005 | 2 | 0 | 2 | 0 | — | — | | |
| Nathan Kamara | DF | 2006 | 2 | 0 | 2 | 0 | — | — | | |
| Arran Reid | GK | 2006 | 2 | 0 | 2 | 0 | — | — | | |
| Carl Jones | DF | 2007 | 2 | 0 | 2 | 0 | — | — | | |
| Nick Hegarty † | MF | 2007 | 2 | 0 | 2 | 0 | — | — | | |
| Chris Hall † | MF | 2008 | 2 | 0 | 2 | 0 | — | — | (Note: Gainsborough Trinity) | |
| Artur Krysiak † | GK | 2008 | 2 | 0 | 2 | 0 | Poland under-19 | — | | |
| Steve Torpey | FW | 2009 | 2 | 0 | 2 | 0 | — | — | | |
| Eugen Bopp | MF | 2012 | 2 | 0 | 2 | 0 | Germany under-19 | — | | |
| Ben Everson | FW | 2013 | 2 | 0 | 2 | 0 | — | — | | |
| Tom Chamberlain | FW | 2013 | 2 | 0 | 2 | 0 | — | — | | |
| Chris Dickinson | FW | 2014 | 2 | 0 | 2 | 0 | — | — | | |
| Fraser Murdoch | FW | 2016 | 2 | 0 | 2 | 0 | — | — | | |
| Franklyn Clarke | MF | 2016 | 2 | 0 | 2 | 0 | — | — | | |
| Jake Charles † | FW | 2016 | 2 | 0 | 2 | 0 | Wales under-21 | — | | |
| Maison Campbell | GK | 2023 | 2 | 0 | 2 | 0 | — | — | | |
| Jack Stott † | MF | 2023 | 2 | 0 | 2 | 0 | — | — | | |
| Brooke | FW | 1924 | 1 | 1 | 2 | 1 | — | — | | |
| Mark Wood | MF | 1990–1991 | 1 | 0 | 2 | 0 | — | — | | |
| Tommy Harrison | MF / FW | 1997 | 1 | 0 | 2 | 0 | Scotland under-18 | — | | |
| Richard Alderson | MF | 1998 | 1 | 0 | 2 | 0 | — | — | | |
| Graham Rennison | DF | 1998 | 1 | 0 | 2 | 0 | — | — | | |
| Deon Burton † | FW | 2014 | 1 | 0 | 2 | 0 | Jamaica | 0 | | |
| Owen Gamble | MF | 2020 | 1 | 0 | 2 | 0 | — | — | | |
| Kyle Lancaster | FW | 2021 | 1 | 0 | 2 | 0 | — | — | | |
| Will Jarvis † | FW | 2022 | 1 | 0 | 2 | 0 | — | — | | |
| Arthur Routledge | FW | 1945 | 0 | 0 | 2 | 0 | — | — | | |
| Luka Ozisik * | MF | 2026–present | 0 | 0 | 2 | 0 | — | — | | |
| Billy Dinsdale | FW | 1923 | 1 | 0 | 1 | 0 | — | — | | |
| Jack Barrett | FW | 1923 | 1 | 0 | 1 | 0 | — | — | | |
| C. Howarth | FW | 1923 | 1 | 0 | 1 | 0 | — | — | | |
| A. Tomes | HB | 1923 | 1 | 0 | 1 | 0 | — | — | | |
| Shann | FW | 1924 | 1 | 0 | 1 | 0 | — | — | | |
| E. Atkinson | FW | 1924 | 1 | 0 | 1 | 0 | — | — | | |
| Clarke | FW | 1924 | 1 | 0 | 1 | 0 | — | — | | |
| Joe Surtees | FW | 1924 | 1 | 0 | 1 | 0 | — | — | | |
| G. Blythe | FW | 1924 | 1 | 0 | 1 | 0 | — | — | | |
| John Kendall | HB | 1924 | 1 | 0 | 1 | 0 | — | — | | |
| Croft | FW | 1924 | 1 | 0 | 1 | 0 | — | — | | |
| Terry Ashdown | HB | 1925 | 1 | 0 | 1 | 0 | — | — | | |
| Jones | FW | 1925 | 1 | 1 | 1 | 1 | — | — | | |
| J. Bell | FW | 1926 | 1 | 0 | 1 | 0 | — | — | | |
| Eric Kay | HB | 1926 | 1 | 0 | 1 | 0 | — | — | | |
| Martin | FW | 1926 | 1 | 0 | 1 | 0 | — | — | | |
| Joe Tillotson | FW | 1926 | 1 | 0 | 1 | 0 | — | — | | |
| Thornton Kay | FW | 1926 | 1 | 0 | 1 | 0 | — | — | | |
| Ron Clancey | FW | 1927 | 1 | 1 | 1 | 1 | — | — | | |
| Tyson | FW | 1927 | 1 | 2 | 1 | 2 | — | — | | |
| Addison | HB | 1928 | 1 | 0 | 1 | 0 | — | — | | |
| Walter Bolton | HB | 1928 | 1 | 0 | 1 | 0 | — | — | | |
| Reg Chown | GK | 1928 | 1 | 0 | 1 | 0 | — | — | | |
| Stanley Blackburn | FW | 1931 | 1 | 0 | 1 | 0 | — | — | | |
| John Turnbull | FW | 1932 | 1 | 0 | 1 | 0 | — | — | | |
| Bert King | FW | 1933 | 1 | 0 | 1 | 0 | — | — | | |
| Thomas Pawson | FW | 1935 | 1 | 0 | 1 | 0 | — | — | | |
| Charlie MacCartney | FW | 1937 | 1 | 0 | 1 | 0 | — | — | | |
| Sydney Chappell | HB | 1939 | 1 | 0 | 1 | 0 | — | — | | |
| John Gargan | HB | 1946 | 1 | 0 | 1 | 0 | — | — | | |
| Arthur Roberts | HB | 1946 | 1 | 0 | 1 | 0 | — | — | | |
| Jim Jowett | FW | 1946 | 1 | 0 | 1 | 0 | — | — | | |
| Don Greenwell | HB | 1947 | 1 | 0 | 1 | 0 | — | — | | |
| John Lawson | FW | 1947 | 1 | 0 | 1 | 0 | — | — | | |
| Don Harnby | FB | 1947 | 1 | 0 | 1 | 0 | — | — | | |
| Jimmy Pegg | GK | 1950 | 1 | 0 | 1 | 0 | — | — | | |
| Gordon Medd | FW | 1951 | 1 | 0 | 1 | 0 | — | — | | |
| David Lloyd | FW | 1951 | 1 | 0 | 1 | 0 | — | — | | |
| Peter Desmond | FW | 1951 | 1 | 0 | 1 | 0 | Republic of Ireland | 0 | | |
| Eric Kirby | HB | 1952 | 1 | 0 | 1 | 0 | — | — | | |
| Norman Jukes | FB | 1953 | 1 | 0 | 1 | 0 | — | — | | |
| Ken Williams | HB | 1953 | 1 | 0 | 1 | 0 | — | — | | |
| Arnold Charlesworth | FW | 1954 | 1 | 0 | 1 | 0 | — | — | | |
| Walter Jones | HB | 1954 | 1 | 0 | 1 | 0 | — | — | | |
| Ron Smith | HB | 1955 | 1 | 0 | 1 | 0 | — | — | | |
| John Stewart | FW | 1957 | 1 | 0 | 1 | 0 | — | — | | |
| Derek Middleton | HB | 1958 | 1 | 0 | 1 | 0 | — | — | | |
| Bryn Jones | DF | 1960 | 1 | 0 | 1 | 0 | — | — | | |
| Keith Hague | DF | 1966 | 1 | 0 | 1 | 0 | — | — | | |
| John Brookes | FW | 1966 | 1 | 0 | 1 | 0 | — | — | | |
| Ray Pennick | FW | 1969 | 1 | 0 | 1 | 0 | — | — | | |
| Barry McArthur † | FW | 1970 | 1 | 0 | 1 | 0 | — | — | | |
| Neil Rioch † | DF | 1972 | 1 | 0 | 1 | 0 | England under-18 | — | | |
| Andy Leaf | DF | 1980 | 1 | 0 | 1 | 0 | — | — | | |
| Dave King | MF | 1983 | 1 | 0 | 1 | 0 | — | — | | |
| David Downing | FW | 1987 | 1 | 0 | 1 | 0 | — | — | | |
| Riccardo Gabbiadini | FW | 1988 | 1 | 0 | 1 | 0 | — | — | | |
| Nigel Hart | DF | 1991 | 1 | 0 | 1 | 0 | — | — | | |
| Neil Grayson | FW | 1991 | 1 | 0 | 1 | 0 | England C | — | | |
| Mark Bradshaw † | DF | 1991 | 1 | 0 | 1 | 0 | England C | — | | |
| Paul McLoughlin † | FW | 1992 | 1 | 0 | 1 | 0 | — | — | | |
| Elliott Simpson | DF | 1994 | 1 | 0 | 1 | 0 | — | — | | |
| Ben Rhodes | MF | 2001 | 1 | 0 | 1 | 0 | — | — | | |
| Craig Dove † | MF | 2003 | 1 | 0 | 1 | 0 | England under-20 | — | | |
| Phil Bell † | FW | 2007 | 1 | 0 | 1 | 0 | — | — | (Note: Whitley Bay) | |
| George Purcell | FW | 2010 | 1 | 0 | 1 | 0 | — | — | | |
| David Knight † | GK | 2011 | 1 | 0 | 1 | 0 | England under-19 | — | (Note: Histon) | |
| Reece Kelly | MF | 2012 | 1 | 0 | 1 | 0 | — | — | | |
| Jordan Lussey † | DF | 2015 | 1 | 0 | 1 | 0 | England under-18 | — | | |
| Tyler Walton | MF | 2016 | 1 | 0 | 1 | 0 | — | — | | |
| Ben Barber | DF | 2016 | 1 | 0 | 1 | 0 | — | — | | |
| Alex Bruton | MF | 2016 | 1 | 0 | 1 | 0 | — | — | | |
| Ryan Edmondson | FW | 2017 | 1 | 0 | 1 | 0 | England under-19 | — | | |
| Marcus Williams † | DF | 2018 | 1 | 0 | 1 | 0 | — | — | | |
| Gabby McGill † | FW | 2021 | 1 | 0 | 1 | 0 | — | — | (Note: Dunfermline Athletic) | |
| Jonny Haase | DF | 2021 | 1 | 0 | 1 | 0 | — | — | | |
| Leone Gravata | MF | 2024 | 1 | 0 | 1 | 0 | — | — | | |
| George Grumley | DF | 2025 | 1 | 0 | 1 | 0 | — | — | | |
| Eddie Kettlewell | FW | 2025 | 1 | 0 | 1 | 0 | — | — | | |
| Stan Green | FW | 1945 | 0 | 0 | 1 | 0 | — | — | | |
| Richard Maddison | FW | 1945 | 0 | 0 | 1 | 1 | — | — | | |
| Tom Kelly | HB | 1951 | 0 | 0 | 1 | 0 | — | — | | |
| Nick Murphy | DF | 1986 | 0 | 0 | 1 | 0 | — | — | | |
| Josh Radcliffe | DF | 2009 | 0 | 0 | 1 | 0 | — | — | | |
| Cameron Murray | MF | 2013 | 0 | 0 | 1 | 0 | — | — | | |
| Chris Kettings † | GK | 2013 | 0 | 0 | 1 | 0 | Scotland under-21 | — | | |
| Charlie Jebson-King | DF | 2019 | 0 | 0 | 1 | 0 | — | — | | |
| Alex Hernandez | FW | 2024 | 0 | 0 | 1 | 0 | — | — | | |
| Nico Lawrence | DF | 2025 | 0 | 0 | 1 | 0 | — | — | | |

== Notes ==
Player statistics include matches played while on loan from:
