= Tony Moore =

Tony Moore may refer to:

== Arts and entertainment ==
- Tony Moore (artist) (born 1978), comic book artist on titles such as Fear Agent, The Exterminators, and The Walking Dead
- Tony Moore (musician) (born 1958), member of Cutting Crew and Iron Maiden
- Tony Moore (singer), lead singer of metal band Riot

== Sport ==
- Tony Moore (athlete), Fijian long jumper
- Tony Moore (footballer, born 1943), English footballer
- Tony Moore (footballer, born 1947) (1947–2017), English footballer
- Tony Moore (rugby union), Australian international rugby union player

== Others ==
- Tony P. Moore, Republican member of the North Carolina General Assembly

== See also ==
- Tony Moor (born 1940), English football goalkeeper
- Anthony Moore (born 1948), music composer and producer
- Antonis Mor (1517–1577), Dutch painter
- Anthony Moore (politician), Oklahoma politician
- Romanthony, born Anthony Moore, DJ, producer, singer and songwriter
