= Malcolm Lang =

Malcolm Lang may refer to:

- Malcolm Lang (footballer) (born 1941), English footballer
- Malcolm Lang (politician) (1875–1941), Canadian politician
