= John Hammerton =

John Hammerton may refer to:

- John Alexander Hammerton (1871–1949), British encyclopedist
- John Hammerton (footballer) (1900–1978), English footballer
