= Spofforth =

Spofforth can refer to:

== Places ==
- Spofforth, North Yorkshire, England

== People ==
- David Spofforth (born 1969), English professional footballer
- Gemma Spofforth (born 1987) British Olympic Swimmer
- Fred Spofforth (1853–1926) Australian cricketer
- Reginald Spofforth (1769–1826), English composer
