= Phil Taylor (footballer, born 1958) =

English footballer

Personal information
- Full name: Philip Anthony Taylor
- Date of birth: 11 July 1958 (age 68)
- Place of birth: Sheffield, West Riding of Yorkshire, England
- Height: 5 ft 9 in (1.75 m)
- Position: Winger

Senior career*
Years	Team	Apps	(Gls)
- Woodland Rangers
1975–1978	York City	21	(1)
1978–1980	Darlington	26	(2)
1980–	Lincoln City	0	(0)
- Guisborough Town
Total		47	(3)
- * Club domestic league appearances and goals

Philip Anthony Taylor (born 11 July 1958) is an English former professional footballer who played as a winger in the Football League for York City and Darlington, in non-League football for Woodland Rangers and Guisborough Town and was on the books of Lincoln City without making a league appearance.
