= Scott Oxley =

English footballer

Personal information
- Full name: Scott Oxley
- Date of birth: 22 November 1976 (age 49)
- Place of birth: Sheffield, South Yorkshire, England
- Height: 5 ft 9 in (1.75 m)
- Position: Winger

Youth career
- –1995: York City

Senior career*
Years	Team	Apps	(Gls)
1995–1996	York City	2	(0)
1996–????	Stocksbridge Park Steels		
Total		2	(0)
- * Club domestic league appearances and goals

Scott Oxley (born 22 November 1976) is an English former professional footballer who played as a winger in the Football League for York City, and in non-League football for Stocksbridge Park Steels.
