= James Turley =

English footballer

Personal information
- Date of birth: 24 June 1981 (age 45)
- Place of birth: Manchester, England
- Position: Winger

Youth career
- 19??–1998: York City

Senior career*
Years	Team	Apps	(Gls)
1998–2001	York City	21	(2)
2001	Scarborough	4	(0)
2001–2002	Stalybridge Celtic	10	(1)
2002–2005	Harrogate Town		
2005–2007	Stalybridge Celtic		
2006	→ Mossley (loan)		
2007	Witton Albion		
2007–????	Buxton		
- * Club domestic league appearances and goals as of 14:03, 8 December 2008 (UTC)

James Turley (born 24 June 1981) is an English former professional footballer.

Turley began his career as a trainee with York City, turning professional in August 1998. He made his league debut on 18 September 1999, starting in the 2–1 defeat away to Exeter City. He struggled to gain a regular place in the York side and was released in May 2001. He joined Torquay United on trial, playing in the 3-0 friendly win against Clyst Rovers on 31 July, but failed to impress new manager Roy McFarland sufficiently to warrant any further interest.

On 21 August 2001 he signed for Scarborough, who had tried to sign him a year earlier, but made only 4 appearances as a substitute in their Conference side before joining Stalybridge Celtic on 20 October 2001. He moved to Harrogate Town in 2002, and was player of the year in the 2003–04 season. He was linked with moves to Hucknall Town and Barrow in the 2004 close season, but chose to remain with Harrogate.

Turley announced that he would be leaving Harrogate in May 2005 and subsequently rejoined Stalybridge Celtic later that month.

In October 2006, Turley joined Mossley on loan.

Turley joined Witton Albion in June 2007, but moved on again, to Buxton, in September that year.
