= Dave Stainwright =

English footballer

Personal information
- Full name: David Peter Stainwright
- Date of birth: 13 June 1948 (age 78)
- Place of birth: Nottingham, England
- Height: 5 ft 9 in (1.75 m)
- Position: Inside forward

Youth career
- 1963–1965: Nottingham Forest

Senior career*
Years	Team	Apps	(Gls)
1965–1968	Nottingham Forest	7	(1)
1988–1969	Doncaster Rovers	2	(0)
1969–1970	York City	8	(1)
1970–	Heanor Town		
Total		17	(2)
- * Club domestic league appearances and goals

David Peter Stainwright (born 13 June 1948) is an English former professional footballer who played as an inside forward in the Football League for Nottingham Forest, Doncaster Rovers and York City, and in non-League football for Heanor Town.
