= Marc Salvati =

English footballer

Personal information
- Full name: Marc Robert Salvati
- Date of birth: 5 March 1983 (age 43)
- Place of birth: Middlesbrough, England
- Height: 5 ft 8 in (1.73 m)
- Position: Midfielder

Youth career
- Manchester United
- –2001: York City

Senior career*
Years	Team	Apps	(Gls)
2001–2002	York City	8	(1)
- Whitby Town
Total		8	(1)
- * Club domestic league appearances and goals

Marc Robert Salvati (born 5 March 1983) is an English former professional footballer who played as a midfielder in the Football League for York City, in non-League football for Whitby Town, and was on the books of Manchester United without making a league appearance.
