= Maurice McDermott (footballer) =

English footballer (1923–1988)

Personal information
- Full name: Maurice Patrick McDermott
- Date of birth: 21 February 1923
- Place of birth: Pelton Fell, County Durham, England
- Date of death: 9 February 1988 (aged 64)
- Place of death: Stockton-on-Tees, England
- Height: 5 ft 9 1/2 in (1.77 m)
- Position: Full-back

Senior career*
Years	Team	Apps	(Gls)
- Consett
1945–	Sunderland	0	(0)
- Consett
1947	York City	7	(0)
- Annfield Plain
Total		7	(0)
- * Club domestic league appearances and goals

Maurice Patrick McDermott (21 February 1923 – 9 February 1988) was an English professional footballer who played as a full-back in the Football League for York City, in non-League football for Consett and Annfield Plain, and was on the books of Sunderland without making a league appearance.
