= Stuart Alderson =

English footballer

Personal information
- Date of birth: 15 August 1948 (age 78)
- Place of birth: Bishop Auckland, England
- Position: Winger

Senior career*
Years	Team	Apps	(Gls)
1966–1967	Newcastle United	3	(0)
1967–1968	York City	19	(5)
	Ashington	?	(?)
- * Club domestic league appearances and goals

Stuart Alderson (born 15 August 1948 in Bishop Auckland, England) is an English former footballer.
