= Ernie Nettleton =

English footballer

Personal information
- Full name: Ernest Nettleton
- Date of birth: 7 January 1918
- Place of birth: Sheffield, West Riding of Yorkshire, England
- Date of death: 5 March 2005 (aged 87)
- Place of death: Pembroke, Pembrokeshire, Wales
- Position: Winger

Senior career*
Years	Team	Apps	(Gls)
1946–1947	York City	7	(2)
Total		7	(2)
- * Club domestic league appearances and goals

Ernest Nettleton (7 January 1918 – 5 March 2005) was an English professional footballer who was a winger in the Football League for York City and played wartime football for Sheffield United and York.
