= Ron Thompson (footballer, born 1921) =

English footballer

Personal information
- Full name: Ronald Thompson
- Date of birth: 24 December 1921
- Place of birth: Sheffield, West Riding of Yorkshire, England
- Date of death: 1988 (aged 66–67)
- Height: 5 ft 9 in (1.75 m)
- Position: Inside forward

Senior career*
Years	Team	Apps	(Gls)
–1945	Wadsley Common		
1945–1947	Sheffield Wednesday	0	(0)
1947–1949	Rotherham United	30	(11)
1949–1950	York City	8	(0)
1950–	Gainsborough Trinity		
Total		38	(11)
- * Club domestic league appearances and goals

Ronald Thompson (24 December 1921 – 1988) was an English professional footballer who played as an inside forward in the Football League for Rotherham United and York City, in non-League football for Wadsley Common and Gainsborough Trinity, and was on the books of Sheffield Wednesday without making a league appearance.
