= Michael Evans (Dutch footballer) =

Dutch association football player

Personal information
- Date of birth: 21 July 1976 (age 50)
- Place of birth: Venlo, Netherlands
- Position: Striker

Youth career
- 1982–1986: VOS
- 1986–1995: Venlosche Boys

Senior career*
Years	Team	Apps	(Gls)
1995–2001	VVV-Venlo	159	(30)
2001	York City	2	(0)
2002–2005	De Treffers		
2005–2006	Schijndel		
2006–2008	Gemert		
2008–2009	JVC Cuijk		
2009–2010	Rood-Wit		
- * Club domestic league appearances and goals

Michael Evans (born July 21, 1976) is a Dutch former professional footballer.

== Club career ==
He made his professional debut for VVV-Venlo in an August 1995 Eerste Divisie match against RBC and after six seasons with his hometown club Evans tried out for Bradford City for three weeks, after which he had a trial at York City early in the 2001–02 season. He was signed by York initially on a one-month contract. He returned to Holland to play 7 seasons in the Dutch Hoofdklasse.

Evans was born in the Netherlands with an American father. He was released by JVC Cuijk in summer 2009 and joined fellow amateurs Rood Wit Groesbeek.
