= Ian Burden (footballer) =

English footballer

Personal information
- Full name: Ian Burden
- Date of birth: 27 May 1944 (age 82)
- Place of birth: Bradford, West Riding of Yorkshire, England
- Height: 6 ft 2 in (1.88 m)
- Position: Striker

Senior career*
Years	Team	Apps	(Gls)
- Poppleton Road Old Boys
1965–1966	York City	3	(2)
1967–1968	Dunnington		
1968	Ashfield		
1968–1969	Rowntrees		
1969–	Shepherds		
Total		3	(2)
- * Club domestic league appearances and goals

Ian Burden (born 27 May 1944) is an English former amateur footballer who played as a striker in the Football League for York City, and in non-League football for Poppleton Road Old Boys, Dunnington, Ashfield, Rowntrees and Shepherds.
