= Craig Wilding =

English footballer

Personal information
- Full name: Craig Anthony Wilding
- Date of birth: 30 October 1981 (age 45)
- Place of birth: Birmingham, West Midlands, England
- Height: 5 ft 10 in (1.78 m)
- Position: Striker

Youth career
- –1999: Chesterfield

Senior career*
Years	Team	Apps	(Gls)
1999–2002	Chesterfield	0	(0)
2002–2003	York City	7	(0)
2003–	Stafford Rangers		
Total		7	(0)
- * Club domestic league appearances and goals

Craig Anthony Wilding (born 30 October 1981) is an English former professional footballer who played as a striker in the Football League for York City, in non-League football for Stafford Rangers, and was on the books of Chesterfield without making a league appearance.
