= Jimmy Crangle =

Scottish footballer

Personal information
- Full name: James Patrick Crangle
- Date of birth: 4 April 1953 (age 73)
- Place of birth: Glasgow, Scotland
- Height: 5 ft 5 in (1.65 m)
- Position: Winger

Senior career*
Years	Team	Apps	(Gls)
1970-1972	Campsie Black Watch		
1972–1973	York City	4	(0)
1974–1975	Selby Town		
1981–1987	Osbaldwick		
1989–1991	Copmanthorpe		
- * Club domestic league appearances and goals

James Patrick Crangle (born 4 April 1953) is a Scottish former professional footballer who played as a winger for Campsie Black Watch. York City, Selby Town, Osbaldwick, and Copmanthorpe. He later worked and played as a juniors coach at Osbaldwick, Copmanthorpe, and Dunnington, before coaching the under-14s Centre of Excellence team at York City.
