= William Povey =

English footballer

Personal information
- Full name: William Povey
- Date of birth: 11 January 1943 (age 83)
- Place of birth: Billingham, England
- Height: 5 ft 8 in (1.73 m)
- Position: Winger

Senior career*
Years	Team	Apps	(Gls)
1960–1964	Middlesbrough	6	(0)
1964	York City	3	(0)
Total		9	(0)
- * Club domestic league appearances and goals

William Povey (born 11 January 1943) is an English former professional footballer who played as a winger in the Football League for York City, and was on the books of Middlesbrough where he made 6 league appearances.
