= Sam McNab =

Scottish footballer

Personal information
- Full name: Samuel McNab
- Date of birth: 20 October 1926
- Place of birth: Glasgow, Scotland
- Date of death: 2 November 1995 (aged 69)
- Place of death: Glasgow, Scotland
- Height: 5 ft 7 in (1.70 m)
- Position: Inside forward

Senior career*
Years	Team	Apps	(Gls)
- Dalry Thistle
1952–1954	Sheffield United	11	(4)
1954–1956	York City	19	(3)
1956–1957	Cheltenham Town		
1957–????	Hamilton Academical	1	(0)
Total		31	(7)
- * Club domestic league appearances and goals

Samuel McNab (20 October 1926 – 2 November 1995) was a Scottish professional footballer who played as an inside forward in the Football League for Sheffield United and York City, in non-League football for Cheltenham Town, in the Scottish Football League for Hamilton Academical, and in Scottish junior football for Dalry Thistle.
