= Ray Pennick =

English footballer

Personal information
- Full name: Raymond Pennick
- Date of birth: 30 November 1946 (age 79)
- Place of birth: Ferryhill, England
- Position: Forward

Senior career*
Years	Team	Apps	(Gls)
?–1969	Willington	?	(?)
1969	York City	1	(0)
Total		1+	(0+)
- * Club domestic league appearances and goals

Raymond "Ray" Pennick (born 30 November 1946) is an English former footballer who played as a forward. He played for Willington and York City.

== Career ==
Born in Ferryhill, County Durham, Pennick was a student teacher when playing for Willington in the Northern League. He impressed in a friendly against Fourth Division York City in March 1963 and was signed by the club on amateur terms later that month. His debut came as a 60th minute substitute for Archie Taylor in a 0–0 draw at home to Halifax Town on 5 May 1969. This was Pennick's only appearance for York and he left the club in June 1969.

== Career statistics ==
Appearances and goals by club, season and competition
Club	Season	League (Note: The "League" column constitutes appearances and goals in the Football League.)		FA Cup		League Cup		Total	
Club	Season	Apps	Goals	Apps	Goals	Apps	Goals	Apps	Goals
York City	1968–69	1	0	0	0	0	0	1	0
Career totals		1	0	0	0	0	0	1	0
