= Nicky Scaife =

English footballer

Personal information
- Full name: Nicholas Antony Scaife
- Date of birth: 14 May 1975 (age 51)
- Place of birth: Middlesbrough, North Yorkshire, England
- Height: 6 ft 1 in (1.85 m)
- Position: Midfielder

Youth career
- Guisborough Town

Senior career*
Years	Team	Apps	(Gls)
- Whitby Town
1995–1996	York City	2	(0)
1996–????	Pickering Town		
- Gateshead
Total		2	(0)
- * Club domestic league appearances and goals

Nicholas Antony Scaife (born 14 May 1975) is an English former professional footballer who played as a midfielder in the Football League for York City, and in non-League football for Guisborough Town, Whitby Town, Pickering Town and Gateshead.
