= Edouard Wojtczak =

Russian-born Polish footballer

Personal information
- Full name: Edouard Andrew Wojtczak
- Date of birth: 29 April 1921
- Place of birth: Syzran, Russia
- Date of death: 11 March 1995 (aged 73)
- Place of death: London, England
- Position: Goalkeeper

Senior career*
Years	Team	Apps	(Gls)
	Polish Army	?	(?)
1946–1947	York City	8	(0)
- * Club domestic league appearances and goals

Edouard Andrew Wojtczak (29 April 1921 – 11 March 1995) was a Russian-born Polish footballer.

== Career ==
Wojtczak served as a tank commander in World War II. He was a member of the Second Polish Army Division, who were stationed in York and signed for York City as an amateur in October 1946. After making a typically acrobatic save, he would often bow to the crowd. He made a total of eight appearances for York.

He would star in ice shows as a skater and walked from York to London on ice skates to publicise a show. He moved to London in 1956 and edited Polish quarterly magazine Fotorama. He died at St Anthony's Hospital, North Cheam after an unsuccessful triple heart by-pass operation.
