= Lloyd Richards (footballer) =

Jamaican footballer (born 1958)

Personal information
- Full name: Lloyd George Richards
- Date of birth: 11 February 1958 (age 68)
- Place of birth: Kingston, Jamaica
- Height: 5 ft 8 in (1.73 m)
- Position: Midfielder

Youth career
- –1976: Notts County

Senior career*
Years	Team	Apps	(Gls)
1976–1980	Notts County	9	(0)
1980–1981	York City	18	(1)
- Ilkeston Town
Total		27	(1)
- * Club domestic league appearances and goals

Lloyd George Richards (born 11 February 1958) is a Jamaican former professional footballer who played as a midfielder in the Football League for Notts County and York City, and in non-League football for Ilkeston Town.
