= Shaun Weatherhead =

English association football player

Personal information
- Full name: Shaun Weatherhead
- Date of birth: 3 September 1970 (age 56)
- Place of birth: Halifax, West Riding of Yorkshire, England
- Height: 5 ft 11 in (1.80 m)
- Position: Defender

Youth career
- 1987–1989: Huddersfield Town

Senior career*
Years	Team	Apps	(Gls)
1989–1990	Huddersfield Town	0	(0)
1990–1991	York City	8	(0)
- Accrington Stanley
Total		8	(0)
- * Club domestic league appearances and goals

Shaun Weatherhead (born 3 September 1970) is an English former professional footballer who played as a defender in the Football League for York City, in non-League football for Accrington Stanley and was on the books of Huddersfield Town without making a league appearance. After leaving York City he played in Hong Kong, China, and South Africa, before ending his career back in England with Accrington Stanley.

== Career statistics ==
Appearances and goals by club, season and competition
Club	Season	League			National Cup		League Cup		Other		Total	
Club	Season	Division	Apps	Goals	Apps	Goals	Apps	Goals	Apps	Goals	Apps	Goals
York City	1990–91	Fourth Division	8	0	0	0	0	0	0	0	8	0
Career total			8	0	0	0	0	0	0	0	8	0
