= Jeff Pears =

English footballer

Personal information
- Full name: Jeffrey Pears
- Date of birth: 14 June 1920
- Place of birth: York, England
- Date of death: 6 April 2003 (aged 82)
- Place of death: York, North Yorkshire, England
- Position: Goalkeeper

Senior career*
Years	Team	Apps	(Gls)
1947–1949	York City	3	(0)
1949–	Scarborough		
Total		3	(0)
- * Club domestic league appearances and goals

Jeffrey Pears (14 June 1920 – 6 April 2003) was an English professional footballer who played as a goalkeeper in the Football League for York City, and in non-League football for Scarborough. He worked at Terry's chocolate factory for 50 years, latterly as chauffeur to the chairman.
