= Ron Smith (footballer, born 1929) =

English footballer (1929–2010)

Personal information
- Full name: Ronald Herbert Smith
- Date of birth: 25 November 1929
- Place of birth: York, England
- Date of death: September 2010 (aged 80)
- Place of death: East Riding of Yorkshire, England
- Height: 6 ft 0 in (1.83 m)
- Position: Half-back

Senior career*
Years	Team	Apps	(Gls)
- Harrogate Railway Athletic
1954–1955	York City	1	(0)
- * Club domestic league appearances and goals

Ronald Herbert Smith (25 November 1929 – September 2010) was an English professional footballer who played as a half-back in the Football League for York City, and in non-League football for Harrogate Railway Athletic.
