= Elliott Simpson =

English footballer

Personal information
- Full name: Elliott David Simpson
- Date of birth: 1 July 1976 (age 50)
- Place of birth: York, England
- Height: 5 ft 10 in (1.78 m)
- Position: Defender

Youth career
- ?–1994: York City

Senior career*
Years	Team	Apps	(Gls)
1994–1995	York City	1	(0)
1995–?	Rowntree	?	(?)
	Pickering Town	?	(?)
	Gainsborough Trinity	?	(?)
	Rowntree	?	(?)
	Harrogate Railway Athletic	?	(?)
Total		1+	(0+)
- * Club domestic league appearances and goals

Elliott David Simpson (born 1 July 1976) is an English former footballer who played as a defender. He played for York City, Rowntree, Pickering Town, Gainsborough Trinity and Harrogate Railway Athletic.

== Career ==
Born in York, Simpson started his career with the York City youth system on a Youth Training Scheme. He was a member of the York youth team that reached the quarter-final of the FA Youth Cup in the 1992–93 season, in which York were beaten 5–0 away at Manchester United. Simpson made his first team debut after starting in a 2–1 victory at home to Brentford in the Second Division on 13 September 1994 and was released by the club in May 1995 having failed to make another appearance. He dropped into non-League football after signing for Rowntree in August 1995. This was followed by spells with Pickering Town and Gainsborough Trinity before returning to Rowntree and finishing his career with Harrogate Railway Athletic.

== Style of play ==
Simpson played as a left winger for York's youth team before being converted into a left back.

== Career statistics ==
Club	Season	League (Note: The "League" column constitutes appearances and goals in the Football League.)		FA Cup		League Cup		Other		Total	
Club	Season	Apps	Goals	Apps	Goals	Apps	Goals	Apps	Goals	Apps	Goals
York City	1994–95	1	0	0	0	0	0	0	0	1	0
Career totals		1	0	0	0	0	0	0	0	1	0
