= Bobby Warrender =

Scottish footballer

Personal information
- Full name: Robert Warrender
- Date of birth: 13 February 1929
- Place of birth: Leven, Fife, Scotland
- Date of death: 19 September 2003 (aged 74)
- Place of death: Leven, Fife, Scotland
- Height: 5 ft 7 in (1.70 m)
- Positions: Inside forward; winger

Senior career*
Years	Team	Apps	(Gls)
1947–1948	East Fife	1	(0)
1952–1954	York City	24	(5)
1955–1961	Brechin City		
1961–1963	East Stirlingshire		
1963–1964	Brechin City		
Total		25+	(5+)
- * Club domestic league appearances and goals

Robert Warrender (13 February 1929 – 19 September 2003) was a Scottish former professional footballer who played as an inside forward or as a winger in Scottish football for East Fife, Brechin City and East Stirlingshire and in the Football League for York City.
