= Barry McArthur =

English footballer

Personal information
- Full name: Barry McArthur
- Date of birth: 4 May 1947 (age 79)
- Place of birth: Nottingham, England
- Height: 5 ft 9 in (1.75 m)
- Position: Striker

Senior career*
Years	Team	Apps	(Gls)
1965–1970	Nottingham Forest	8	(4)
1969	→ Barrow (loan)	8	(0)
1969–1970	→ York City (loan)	1	(0)
- Matlock Town
Total		17	(4)
- * Club domestic league appearances and goals

Barry McArthur (born 4 May 1947) is an English former professional footballer who played as a striker in the Football League for Nottingham Forest, Barrow and York City, and in non-League football for Matlock Town.

McArthur was the first player to come on as a substitute for Nottingham Forest in a league match on 4 September 1965 in the 2–1 away win against Leeds United when Colin Addison was injured.

== Career statistics ==
Club	Season	League			FA Cup		Total	
Club	Season	Division	Apps	Goals	Apps	Goals	Apps	Goals
Nottingham Forest	1966–67	First Division	8	4	2	0	10	4
Nottingham Forest	Total		8	4	2	0	10	4
Barrow		Third Division	8	0				
Barrow	Total		8	0				
York City	1969–70	Fourth Division	1	0				
York City	Total		1	0				
Career total			17	4				
