= Fred Marlow =

English footballer

Personal information
- Full name: Frederick Marlow
- Date of birth: 9 November 1928
- Place of birth: Sheffield, West Riding of Yorkshire, England
- Date of death: March 2013 (aged 86)
- Place of death: Suffolk, England
- Height: 5 ft 7 1/2 in (1.71 m)
- Positions: Half-back; inside forward

Senior career*
Years	Team	Apps	(Gls)
–1947	Hillsborough Boys' Club		
1947–1950	Arsenal	0	(0)
1950–1951	Sheffield Wednesday	0	(0)
1951	Buxton		
1951–1952	Grimsby Town	12	(6)
1952–1953	Goole Town		
1953	Boston United		
1953–1956	York City	24	(0)
1956–	Scarborough		
Total		36	(6)
- * Club domestic league appearances and goals

Frederick Marlow (9 November 1928 – March 2013) was an English professional footballer who played as a half-back or as an inside forward in the Football League for Grimsby Town and York City, in non-League football for Hillsborough Boys' Club, Buxton, Goole Town, Boston United and Scarborough and was on the books of Arsenal and Sheffield Wednesday without making a league appearance.
