= Joe Ashley =

English footballer (1931–2008)

Personal information
- Date of birth: 10 June 1931
- Place of birth: Clowne, England
- Date of death: 24 August 2008 (aged 77)
- Place of death: Chesterfield, Derbyshire, England
- Position: Goalkeeper

Senior career*
Years	Team	Apps	(Gls)
	Frickley Colliery	?	(?)
1950	York City	9	(0)
- * Club domestic league appearances and goals

John "Joe" Ashley (10 June 1931 – 24 August 2008) was an English footballer who played as a goalkeeper.

== Career ==
Born in Clowne, Derbyshire, Ashley joined York City from Frickley Colliery in October 1950. He made nine league appearances for the club and left during that season.
