= Don Harnby =

English footballer

Personal information
- Full name: Donald Reed Harnby
- Date of birth: 20 July 1923
- Place of birth: Hurworth-on-Tees, County Durham, England
- Date of death: 24 October 2009 (aged 86)
- Place of death: Stockton-on-Tees, England
- Height: 5 ft 10 1/2 in (1.79 m)
- Position: Full-back

Senior career*
Years	Team	Apps	(Gls)
- Spennymoor United
1945–1947	Newcastle United	0	(0)
1947	York City	1	(0)
- Spennymoor United
1949–1952	Grimsby Town	34	(0)
Total		35	(0)
- * Club domestic league appearances and goals

Donald Reed Harnby (20 July 1923 – 24 October 2009) was an English professional footballer who played as a full-back in the Football League for York City and Grimsby Town, in non-League football for Spennymoor United, and was on the books of Newcastle United without making a league appearance. He played wartime football for Middlesbrough.
