= Paul Maloney (footballer) =

English footballer (born 1952)

Personal information
- Full name: Paul John Maloney
- Date of birth: 13 January 1952 (age 74)
- Place of birth: Rossington, Yorkshire, England
- Height: 5 ft 8 in (1.73 m)
- Position: Winger

Youth career
- –1969: Huddersfield Town

Senior career*
Years	Team	Apps	(Gls)
1969–1970	Huddersfield Town	0	(0)
1970–1972	York City	8	(0)
- Frickley Athletic
Total		8	(0)
- * Club domestic league appearances and goals

Paul John Maloney (born 13 January 1952) is an English former professional footballer who played as a winger in the Football League for York City, in non-League football for Frickley Athletic, and was on the books of Huddersfield Town without making a league appearance.
