= Tommy Stanley =

English footballer

Personal information
- Full name: Thomas Stanley
- Date of birth: 7 December 1962 (age 63)
- Place of birth: Hemsworth, West Riding of Yorkshire, England
- Height: 5 ft 7 in (1.70 m)
- Position: Midfielder

Youth career
- Elm Valley
- Upton Juniors
- 1979–1980: York City

Senior career*
Years	Team	Apps	(Gls)
1980–1983	York City	18	(0)
- Rowntree Mackintosh
1990–	Selby Town		
- Harrogate Railway Athletic
- Pickering Town
Total		18	(0)
- * Club domestic league appearances and goals

Thomas Stanley (born 7 December 1962) is an English former professional footballer who played as a midfielder in the Football League for York City and in non-League football for Elm Valley, Upton Juniors, Rowntree Mackintosh, Harrogate Railway Athletic and Pickering Town. He had a spell as player-manager of Selby Town.
