= Les Slatter =

English footballer (1931–2023)

Personal information
- Full name: Leslie Arthur Heber Slatter
- Date of birth: 22 November 1931
- Place of birth: Reading, Berkshire, England
- Date of death: September 2023 (aged 91)
- Place of death: Luton, Bedfordshire, England
- Height: 5 ft 7 in (1.70 m)
- Position: Winger

Senior career*
Years	Team	Apps	(Gls)
- Mount Pleasant YC
1949–	Luton Town	1	(0)
1952–1953	Crusaders		(5)
1953–1954	Aston Villa	0	(0)
1954–1955	York City	13	(0)
1955–????	Scarborough		
Total		14	(0)
- * Club domestic league appearances and goals

Leslie Arthur Heber Slatter (22 November 1931 – September 2023) was an English professional footballer who played as a winger in the Football League for Luton Town and York City, in non-League football for Mount Pleasant YC and Scarborough, in Northern Ireland for Crusaders (scoring 10 goals in his sole season), and was on the books of Aston Villa without making a league appearance.

Slatter made 172 consecutive appearances for Scarborough between 1955 and 1959 in all competitions, which was a club record.

Slatter died in Luton in September 2023, at the age of 91.
