= Derek Middleton =

English footballer (1934–2011)

Personal information
- Full name: Derek Middleton
- Date of birth: 13 May 1934
- Place of birth: Ashby-de-la-Zouch, Leicestershire, England
- Date of death: 6 May 2011 (aged 76)
- Place of death: Ibstock, Leicestershire, England
- Position: Half-back

Senior career*
Years	Team	Apps	(Gls)
- Whitwick Colliery
1955–1958	Burton Albion		
1958–1959	York City	1	(0)
Total		1	(0)
- * Club domestic league appearances and goals

Derek Middleton (13 May 1934 – 6 May 2011) was an English professional footballer who played as a defender in the Football League for York City and in non-League football for Whitwick Colliery and Burton Albion. Middleton died in Ibstock on 6 May 2011, at the age of 76.
