= Walter Jones (Northern Irish footballer) =

Northern Ireland association footballer (1925–2020)

Personal information
- Full name: Walter Jones
- Date of birth: 4 April 1925
- Place of birth: Lurgan, Northern Ireland
- Date of death: December 2020 (aged 95)
- Place of death: Doncaster, England
- Height: 5 ft 9 in (1.75 m)
- Position: Right half

Senior career*
Years	Team	Apps	(Gls)
- Linfield
1947–1950	Blackpool	0	(0)
1950–1954	Doncaster Rovers	69	(2)
1954	Grimsby Town	0	(0)
1954	York City	1	(0)
Total		70	(2)
- * Club domestic league appearances and goals

Walter Jones (4 April 1925 – December 2020) was a Northern Irish professional footballer who played as a right half in the Football League for Doncaster Rovers and York City, in Northern Ireland for Linfield, and was on the books of Blackpool and Grimsby Town without making a league appearance. He died in Doncaster in December 2020, at the age of 95.
