= Mark Wood (footballer) =

English footballer (born 1972)

Personal information
- Full name: Mark Wood
- Date of birth: 26 June 1972 (age 54)
- Place of birth: Scarborough, North Riding of Yorkshire, England
- Height: 5 ft 7 in (1.70 m)
- Positions: Winger; midfielder

Youth career
- 1990: York City

Senior career*
Years	Team	Apps	(Gls)
1990–1991	York City	1	(0)
- Pickering Town
- Goole Town
- Pickering Town
Total		1	(0)
- * Club domestic league appearances and goals

Mark Wood (born 27 June 1972) is an English former professional footballer who played as a winger or as a midfielder in the Football League for York City and in non-League football for Pickering Town and Goole Town.
