= Mike De Placido =

English footballer

Personal information
- Full name: Michael Stephen De Placido
- Date of birth: 9 March 1954 (age 72)
- Place of birth: Scarborough, England
- Height: 5 ft 6 in (1.68 m)
- Position: Winger

Senior career*
Years	Team	Apps	(Gls)
1972–1973	York City	11	(0)
1973–?	Scarborough	?	(?)
Total		11	(0)

International career
1972	England Youth	3	(1)
- * Club domestic league appearances and goals

Michael Stephen De Placido (born 9 March 1954) is an English former footballer who played as a winger.

== Career ==
Born in Scarborough, North Yorkshire, De Placido started his career with York City as an amateur before signing a professional contract in March 1972. He was capped by England at youth level during 1972. He made 11 appearances for York before moving into non-League football with Scarborough, where he made four appearances and scored one goal in all competitions. He later played for the local club, "Prince of Wales", in the Scarborough Sunday League.
