= Ron Peart =

English footballer

Personal information
- Full name: Ronald Peart
- Date of birth: 8 March 1920
- Place of birth: Brandon, Lincolnshire, England
- Date of death: 1999 (aged 78–79)
- Height: 5 ft 11 in (1.80 m)
- Position: Half-back

Senior career*
Years	Team	Apps	(Gls)
- Langley Moor
1938–1939	Hartlepools United	0	(0)
1939–1948	Derby County	1	(0)
1948	York City	5	(0)
- Spennymoor United
Total		6	(0)
- * Club domestic league appearances and goals

Ronald Peart (8 March 1920 – 1999) was an English professional footballer who played as a half-back in the Football League for Derby County and York City, in non-League football for Langley Moor and Spennymoor United, and was on the books of Hartlepools United without making a league appearance.
