= Terry Walker (footballer) =

English footballer

Personal information
- Full name: Terence Walker
- Date of birth: 29 November 1921
- Place of birth: Poppleton, England
- Date of death: 4 October 1987 (aged 65)
- Place of death: Mendocino, California, USA
- Height: 5 ft 8 in (1.73 m)
- Position: Inside forward

Senior career*
Years	Team	Apps	(Gls)
- Selby Town
1949–1950	York City	16	(9)
- Goole Town
Total		16	(9)
- * Club domestic league appearances and goals

Terence Walker (29 November 1921 – 4 October 1987) was an English professional footballer who played as an inside forward in the Football League for York City, and in non-League football for Selby Town and Goole Town.
