= Harry Flanaghan =

English footballer

Personal information
- Full name: Henry Nixon Flanaghan
- Date of birth: 10 February 1896
- Place of birth: Nottingham, England
- Date of death: 1938 (aged 41–42)
- Height: 5 ft 6 in (1.68 m)
- Position: Outside left

Senior career*
Years	Team	Apps	(Gls)
1914–1919	Bedlay Juniors		
1919–1920	Third Lanark	47	(5)
1920–1922	Aberdeen	29	(5)
1922–1923	Maidstone United		
1923–1924	Grimsby Town	3	(0)
1924–19??	Denaby United		
- * Club domestic league appearances and goals

Henry Nixon Flanaghan (10 February 1896 – 1938) was an English professional footballer who played as an outside left in the Football League for Grimsby Town and in the Scottish League for Third Lanark and Aberdeen.
