= Keith Newman (English footballer) =

English footballer

Personal information
- Full name: Keith Newman
- Date of birth: 20 November 1949 (age 76)
- Place of birth: Farnham, Surrey, England
- Height: 5 ft 10 in (1.78 m)
- Position: Half-back

Youth career
- –1966: Aldershot

Senior career*
Years	Team	Apps	(Gls)
1966–1970	Aldershot	23	(0)
1970–1971	York City	4	(0)
- Hungerford Town
Total		27	(0)

International career
- England schools
- * Club domestic league appearances and goals

Keith Newman (born 20 November 1949) is an English former professional footballer who played as a half-back in the Football League for Aldershot and York City, and in non-League football for Hungerford Town. He was capped by England schools.
