= Tony Moore (footballer, born 1943) =

English footballer

Personal information
- Full name: Anthony Paul Moore
- Date of birth: 7 February 1943 (age 83)
- Place of birth: York, England
- Height: 5 ft 8 1/2 in (1.74 m)
- Position: Striker

Senior career*
Years	Team	Apps	(Gls)
- Heworth
1962	York City	2	(0)
1964–	Bridlington Trinity		
- Selby Town
Total		2	(0)
- * Club domestic league appearances and goals

Anthony Paul Moore (born 7 February 1943) is an English former professional footballer who played as a striker in the Football League for York City, in non-League football for Heworth, Bridlington Trinity and Selby Town.
