= Malcolm Lang (footballer) =

English footballer

Personal information
- Full name: Malcolm Christian Lang
- Date of birth: 14 January 1941 (age 85)
- Place of birth: Barnsley, West Riding of Yorkshire, England
- Position: Winger

Senior career*
Years	Team	Apps	(Gls)
- Bridlington Trinity
1963–1964	York City	12	(2)
Total		12	(2)
- * Club domestic league appearances and goals

Malcolm Christian Lang (born 14 January 1941) is an English former professional footballer who played as a winger in the Football League for York City, and in non-League football for Bridlington Trinity.
