= David Spofforth =

English footballer

Personal information
- Full name: David Spofforth
- Date of birth: 21 March 1969 (age 57)
- Place of birth: York, England
- Height: 6 ft 0 in (1.83 m)
- Position: Defender

Senior career*
Years	Team	Apps	(Gls)
- Poppleton
1987–1988	York City	3	(0)
1988–	York Railway Institute		
- Nestlé Rowntree
1993–	Selby Town		
Total		3	(0)
- * Club domestic league appearances and goals

David Spofforth (born 21 March 1969) is an English former professional footballer who played as a defender in the Football League for York City, and in non-League football for Poppleton, York Railway Institute, Nestlé Rowntree and Selby Town.
