= John Hammerton (footballer) =

English footballer

Personal information
- Full name: John Daniel Hammerton
- Date of birth: 22 March 1900
- Place of birth: Sheffield, England
- Date of death: 15 June 1978 (aged 78)
- Height: 5 ft 11 in (1.80 m)
- Position: Striker

Senior career*
Years	Team	Apps	(Gls)
1919–1920	Oughtibridge	?	(?)
1920–1922	Barnsley	30	(9)
1922–1923	Rotherham County	67	(35)
1923–1926	Barnsley	0	(0)
1926–1927	York City	22	(18)
1927	Mansfield Town	?	(?)
- * Club domestic league appearances and goals

John Daniel Hammerton (22 March 1900 – 15 June 1978) was an English footballer.

Flood played for Oughtibridge, Barnsley, Rotherham County, York City and Mansfield Town.
