= Alex Cisak =

Association football player

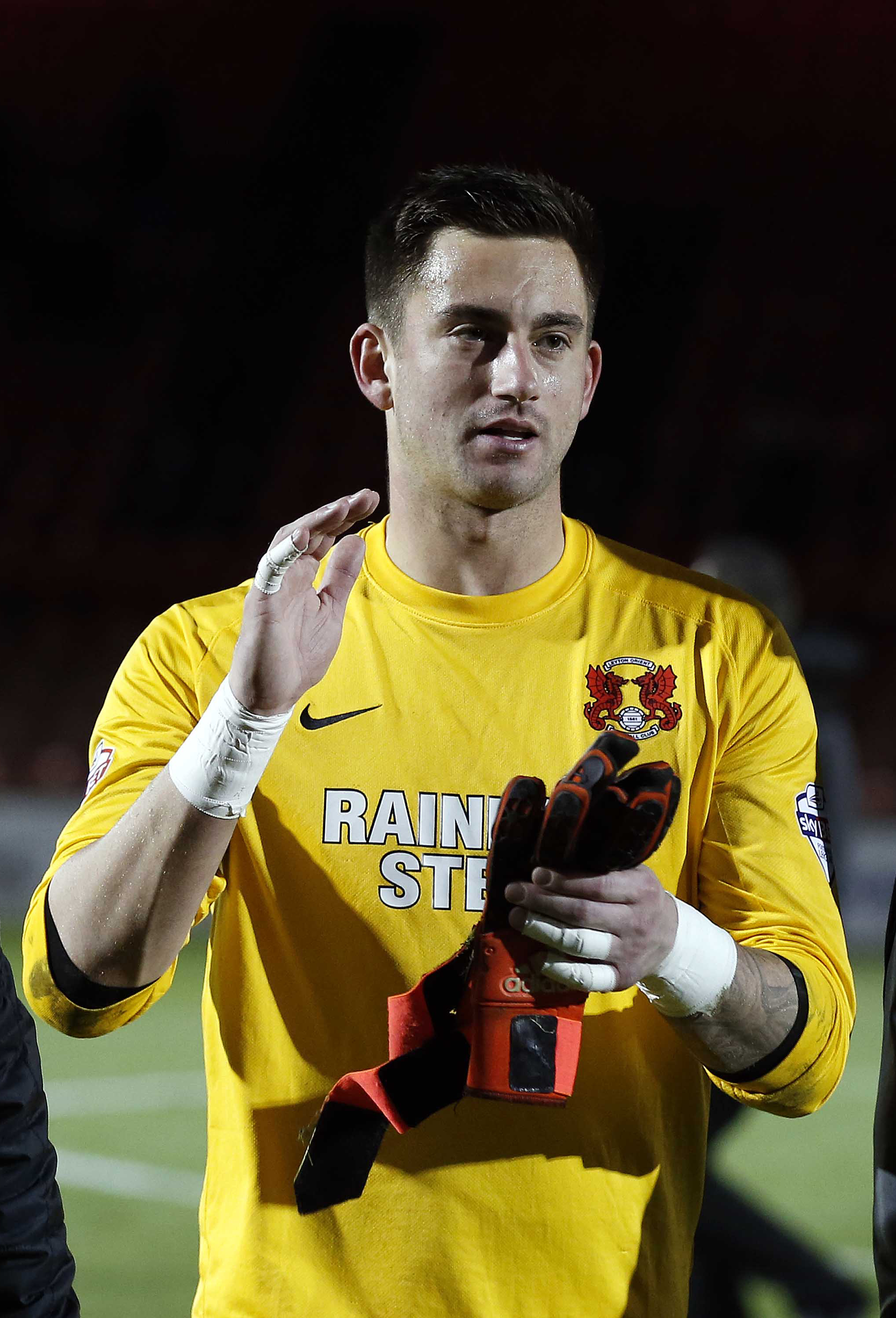
- Cisak playing for Leyton Orient in 2015

Personal information
- Full name: Aleksander Cisak
- Date of birth: 19 May 1989 (age 37)
- Place of birth: Kraków, Poland
- Height: 6 ft 3 in (1.91 m)
- Position: Goalkeeper

Youth career
- 2004: South Hobart
- 2005–2007: Leicester City

Senior career*
Years	Team	Apps	(Gls)
2007–2010	Leicester City	0	(0)
2007	→ Oxford United (loan)	0	(0)
2008	→ Tamworth (loan)	16	(0)
2010–2011	Accrington Stanley	21	(0)
2011–2013	Oldham Athletic	48	(0)
2012	→ Portsmouth (loan)	1	(0)
2013–2015	Burnley	1	(0)
2014–2015	→ York City (loan)	10	(0)
2015	→ Leyton Orient (loan)	19	(0)
2015–2017	Leyton Orient	71	(0)
2017–2019	Sydney FC	0	(0)
Total		187	(0)

International career
2008–2009	Australia U20	5	(0)
- * Club domestic league appearances and goals

Aleksander Cisak (born 19 May 1989) is a retired footballer who played as a goalkeeper. Born in Poland, he represented Australia at under-20 level.

== Early life ==
Cisak was born in Kraków, Lesser Poland Voivodeship, Poland and moved to Hobart, Tasmania, Australia at the age of two.

== Club career ==
=== Leicester City ===
Cisak played for South Hobart in 2004 before signing for English club Leicester City in their youth system as a scholar in 2005. With his young age his family left their family home in Glenorchy, Tasmania to accompany him in Leicester. Cisak was a member of the team that won the 2006–07 FA Premier Academy League.

Cisak signed his first professional contract with Leicester on 5 May 2007, signing a one-year deal alongside Andy King, Max Gradel, Carl Pentney and Eric Odhiambo. He joined Oxford United on loan on 25 September 2007, as a replacement for Chris Tardif. However, on 22 October 2007 he returned to Leicester having failed to make a first team appearance for Oxford.

On 10 January 2008 he moved on loan again joining Tamworth on loan until the end of the season.

Cisak was named in the match squad for the first time as Leicester beat Crewe Alexandra 2–1 at the Walkers Stadium, however he was an unused substitute.

On 8 June 2009 Cisak signed a six-month contract extension at Leicester keeping him at the club until December 2009. At the end of the 2009–10 season, Cisak was released by Leicester, along with seven other players

=== Accrington Stanley ===
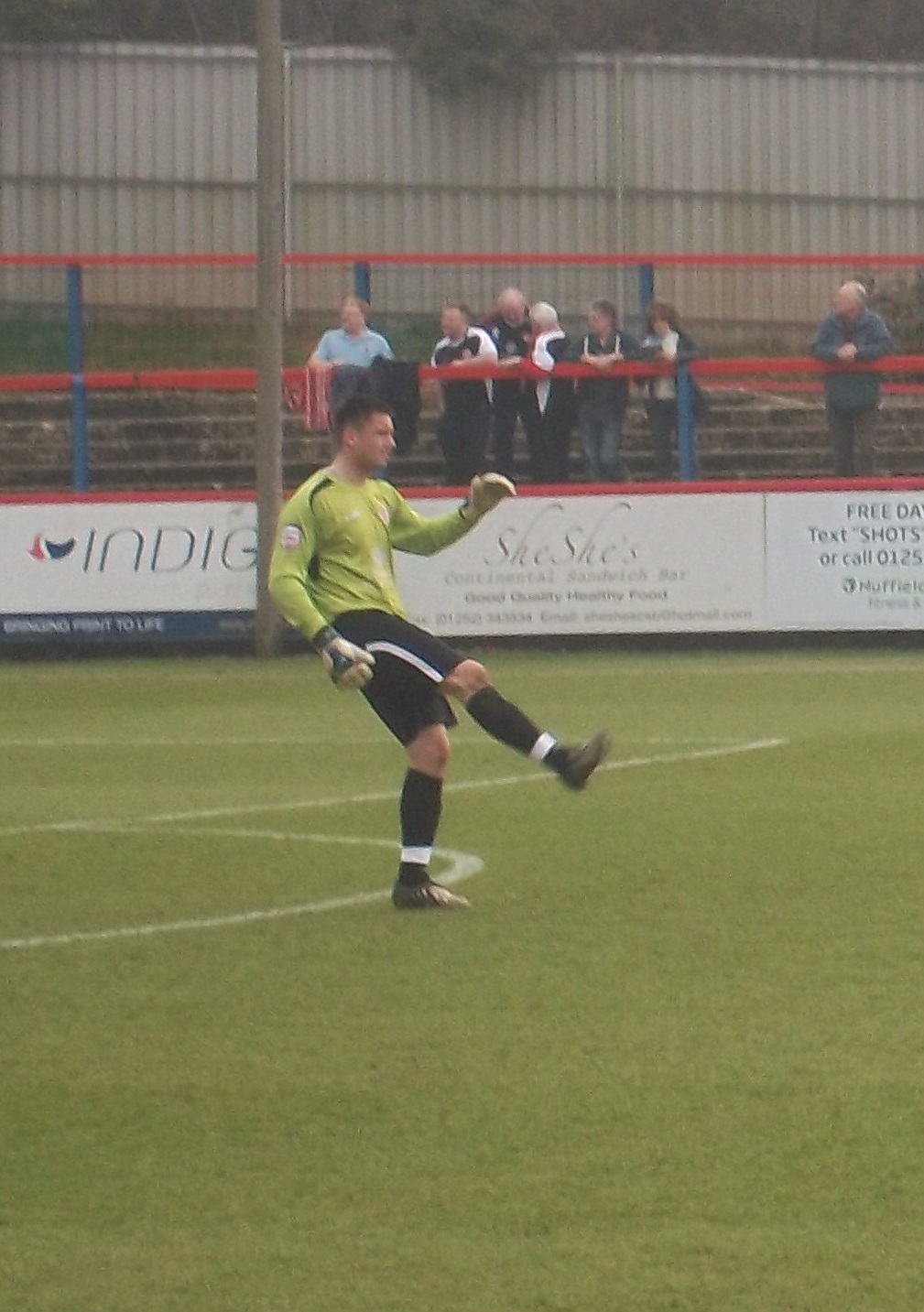
Cisak playing for Accrington Stanley in 2011

Cisak joined Accrington Stanley in July 2010 on a two-year contract after being released by Leicester at the end of the 2009–10 season. He made his debut for the club in a League Cup match on 10 August against Doncaster Rovers. His Football League debut came on 23 October 2010 when he played the full match against Hereford United. While at Accrington Stanley, Cisak battled it out with Ian Dunbavin over a first choice goalkeeper throughout the season and at first, he was the second choice goalkeeper, but eventually regained his place in the second half of the season. He would quickly become a fans' favourite. He won the ESPN PFA Fans' League Two Player of the Month Award for March 2011. In the League Two play-offs, Cisak played twice in the match against Stevenage but lost in both matches. After the matches, Cisak believed the club could bounce back from the play-off defeat. His good performance at the club, led Cisak's future at doubt and was offered a new deal.

=== Oldham Athletic ===
On 6 July 2011, Cisak signed a two-year contract at Oldham Athletic. Oldham agreed a compensation package with Accrington because, though Cisak was out of contract, they were entitled to some recompense as he was under the age of 24. He made his club debut on the first day of the 2011–12 season, starting the Football League match against Sheffield United. Since then, Cisak established himself in the first team and made 43 appearances in the first team. On 5 November 2011, Cisak received his first straight red card of his career in a 2–0 loss against Bury after he brought down Andy Bishop in early minutes. After the match, manager Paul Dickov felt his position has got to be better. Despite his sending off, he played in the next match against Rochdale. In the third of the FA Cup, he played against Liverpool in a 5–1 loss. In a 2–1 win over Walsall on 14 February 2012, Cisak was the hero when he saved a penalty in injury time from Alex Nicholls. In late March, Cisak suffered a shoulder injury in a match against Leyton Orient after he collided with the post and was out for a month. Even though injured, Dickov refused to call up Cisak and James Wesolowski before the end of the season because he risked another injury. After playing five matches in the early of the season, Cisak was replaced by Dean Bouzanis due to a breakdown in his contract. Cisak spoke of his disappointment in Oldham's handling of the saga shortly after having been recalled from his loan at Portsmouth.

Cisak finished his second season with Oldham Athletic as very much the second-choice goalkeeper with Dean Bouzanis established as first-choice goalkeeper for the club, with Cisak making only 11 appearances for the club by the end of the season. On 6 June 2013 after two years at Oldham Athletic, Cisak's contract at Latics was terminated as the club chose not to take up the option to extend his deal for a further year. He left the club having played 59 matches.

=== Portsmouth (loan) ===
On 22 November 2012, Cisak joined fellow League One club Portsmouth on a one-month loan, along with Jake Jervis. He made several key saves in his debut in a 1–1 draw against Coventry City, giving the club their first point in eight matches. After the match, Cisak stated that he could not have asked for a better start in his time at Portsmouth and that he had hopes to replicate the form of his Pompey predecessors such as David James and Asmir Begović. However, after just one appearance, Cisak was recalled by Oldham after Dean Bouzanis was sent off for violent conduct in a 1–0 loss against Doncaster Rovers on Tuesday and leading Paul Dickov to invoke a 24-hour recall clause, leaving back-up goalkeeper Simon Eastwood as their only goalkeeper at Portsmouth. After being recalled, Cisak spoke of his loan spell, expressing his disappointment of the loan deal being cut early, but that he had hopes for a return to Portsmouth in the future.

=== Burnley ===
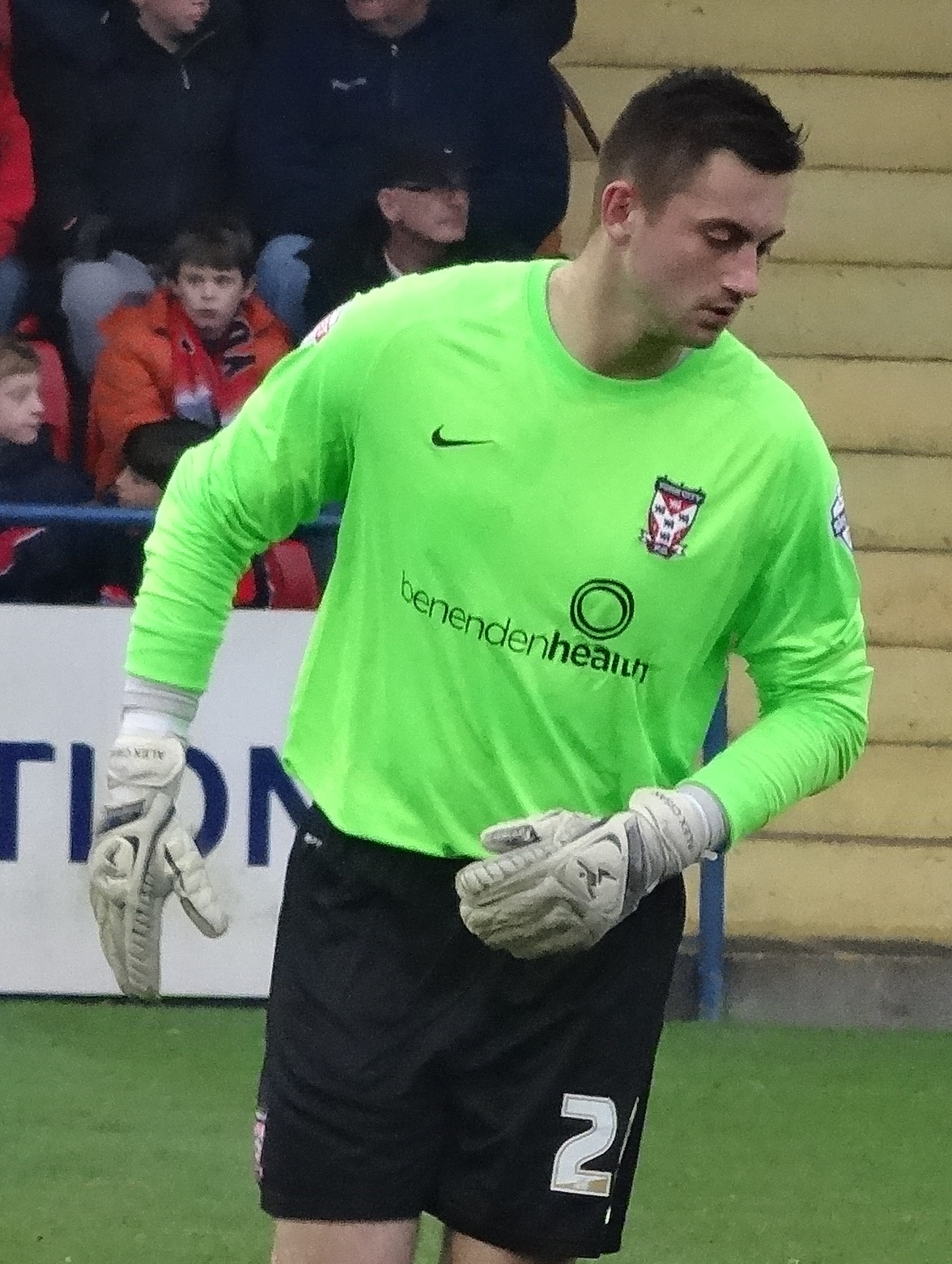
Cisak playing for York City in 2014

Following his release by Oldham, Cisak signed for Championship club Burnley, joining fellow new keepers Tom Heaton and Nick Liversedge. He made his Burnley debut in a 2–0 defeat at Brighton & Hove Albion on 24 August 2013, replacing Keith Treacy in the 57th minute following Tom Heaton's red card. He made his first start for Burnley three days later, keeping a clean sheet in their 2–0 League Cup win against Lancashire rivals Preston North End.

Cisak joined League Two club York City on 24 October 2014 on a one-month loan and made his debut one day later in a 1–1 home draw against Mansfield Town. Having conceded just three goals in four matches his loan was extended until 4 January 2015. He was recalled by Burnley when the loan expired, having made 10 appearances for York.

=== Leyton Orient ===
Cisak signed for League One club Leyton Orient on 2 February 2015 on a one-month loan.

On 27 July 2015, Cisak signed for Leyton Orient permanently on a two-year contract for an undisclosed fee. He was released at the end of 2016–17.

=== Sydney FC ===
On 27 July 2017, Cisak signed a two-year contract with Sydney FC in the A-League. On 1 December, Cisak made his first appearance for Sydney FC in the Y-League where he conceded three goals against rivals Western Sydney Wanderers youth

Cisak made his competitive debut for Sydney in a win over Rockdale City Suns in the 2018 FFA Cup, coming on as a late substitute after Andrew Redmayne suffered an injury.

Following his release from Sydney, Cisak returned to Tasmania and retired from professional football.

== International career ==
Cisak was eligible to play for either Poland or Australia due to holding dual citizenship. In July 2008, Cisak was listed in a group of Australian footballers aged between 16 and 22 known as "the lost boys", including Paul Giannou, Andreas Govas, Robert Stambolziev and Dean Bouzanis, who were likely to play for or had played for national teams of the country of their heritage.

On Monday 6 October 2008 Cisak made his debut for Australia U20 in their 3–1 victory over China playing the full 90 minutes. On 21 July 2009, Cisak was again called into the Australia U20 squad by manager Jan Versleijen for the match against Argentina U20. He has since gone on to make an additional three appearances for the Under 20s and was named in the squad for the 2009 FIFA U-20 World Cup in Egypt.

On 19 August 2015, Cisak was named in a 23-man squad for Australia ahead of two 2018 FIFA World Cup qualifying matches against Bangladesh and Tajikistan.

== Career statistics ==
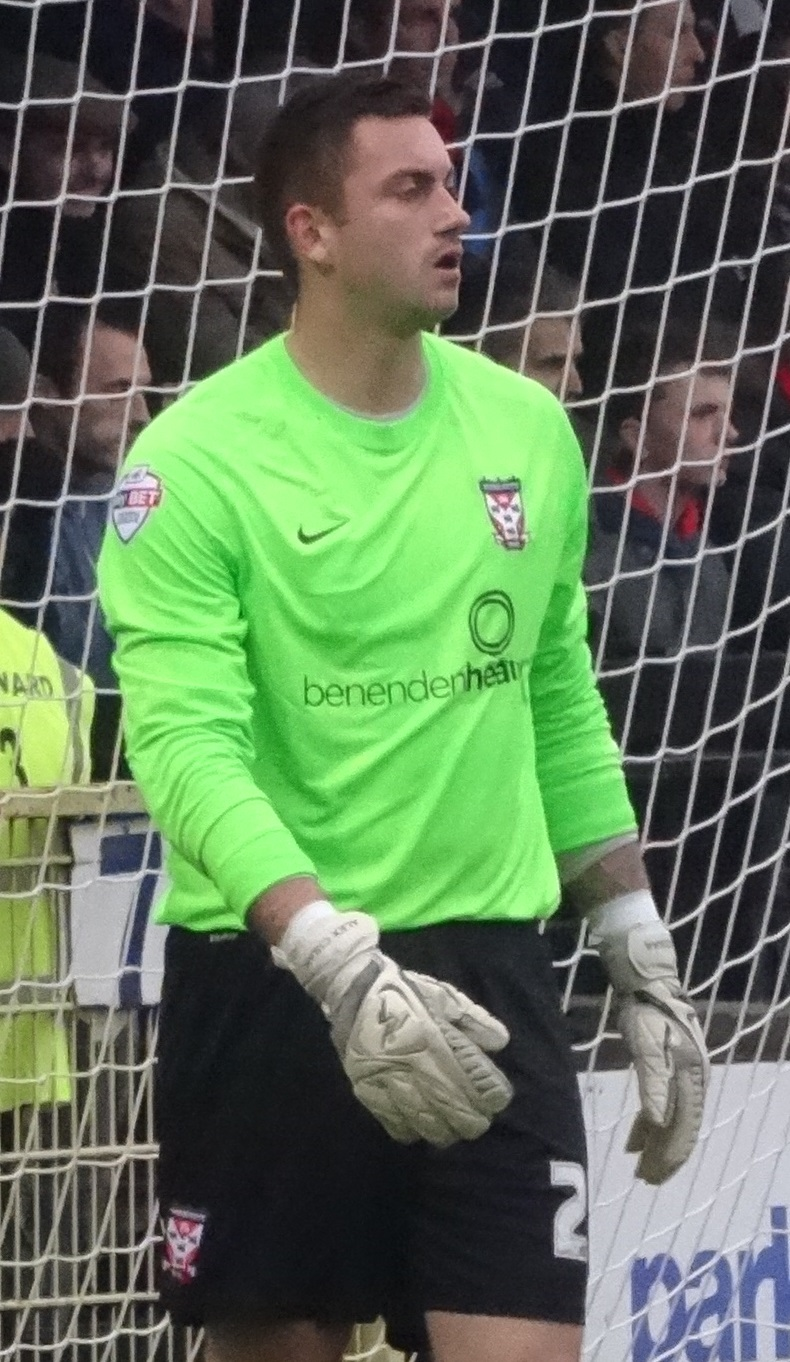
Cisak playing for York City in 2014

As of match played 6 May 2017

Appearances and goals by club, season and competition
Club	Season	League			National Cup		League Cup		Other		Total	
Club	Season	Division	Apps	Goals	Apps	Goals	Apps	Goals	Apps	Goals	Apps	Goals
Leicester City	2007–08	Championship	0	0	0	0	0	0	—		0	0
Leicester City	2008–09	League One	0	0	0	0	0	0	0	0	0	0
Leicester City	2009–10	Championship	0	0	0	0	0	0	0	0	0	0
Leicester City	Total		0	0	0	0	0	0	0	0	0	0
Oxford United (loan)	2007–08	Conference Premier	0	0	—		—		—		0	0
Tamworth (loan)	2007–08	Conference North	16	0	—		—		4 (Note: Appearances in FA Trophy)	0	20	0
Accrington Stanley	2010–11	League Two	21	0	0	0	1	0	3 (Note: One appearance in Football League Trophy, two in League Two play-offs)	0	25	0
Oldham Athletic	2011–12	League One	38	0	4	0	1	0	4 (Note: Appearances in Football League Trophy)	0	47	0
Oldham Athletic	2012–13	League One	10	0	1	0	1	0	0	0	12	0
Oldham Athletic	Total		48	0	5	0	2	0	4	0	59	0
Portsmouth (loan)	2012–13	League One	1	0	—		—		—		1	0
Burnley	2013–14	Championship	1	0	0	0	1	0	—		2	0
Burnley	2014–15	Premier League	0	0	0	0	0	0	—		0	0
Burnley	Total		1	0	0	0	1	0	—		2	0
York City (loan)	2014–15	League Two	10	0	—		—		—		10	0
Leyton Orient (loan)	2014–15	League One	19	0	—		—		—		19	0
Leyton Orient	2015–16	League Two	43	0	2	0	1	0	0	0	46	0
Leyton Orient	2016–17	League Two	28	0	1	0	0	0	1 (Note: Appearance in EFL Trophy)	0	30	0
Leyton Orient	Total		90	0	3	0	1	0	1	0	95	0
Sydney FC	2017–18	A-League	0	0	0	0	—		0	0	0	0
Sydney FC	2018–19	A-League	0	0	1	0	—		0	0	1	0
Sydney FC	Total		0	0	1	0	0	0	0	0	1	0
Career total			187	0	8	0	5	0	12	0	212	0
