= Robert Stambolziev =

Australian soccer player (born 1990)

Personal information
- Full name: Robert Alexander Prince Stambolziev
- Date of birth: 26 October 1990 (age 36)
- Place of birth: Melbourne, Australia
- Height: 1.81 m (5 ft 11 in)
- Position: Winger

Youth career
- 1998–2005: Preston Lions
- 2006: Hume City
- 2007–2009: Bristol City
- 2009–2011: Panathinaikos

Senior career*
Years	Team	Apps	(Gls)
2009–2011	Panathinaikos	0	(0)
2009	→ Kavala (loan)	0	(0)
2011–2012	Proodeftiki	3	(0)
2012	Thrasyvoulos	10	(1)
2012–2013	Olympiakos Nicosia	24	(0)
2013–2014	AEK Kouklia	27	(6)
2014–2015	Niki Volos	7	(0)
2015–2016	Sydney FC	17	(1)
2016	Kidderminster Harriers	5	(0)
2017	PAEEK	32	(15)
2017	Preston Lions	8	(9)
2017–2018	PAEEK		
2018–2020	Altona Magic	31	(10)
2021–2023	Preston Lions	45	(8)

International career
2008–2009	Australia U20	7	(2)
- * Club domestic league appearances and goals

Robert Alexander Petar Stambolziev (born 26 October 1990) is an Australian retired professional soccer player who played as a winger.

A product of Bristol City's Youth Academy to make over 100 appearances in his football career, Stambolziev left Australia at a young age to join the club in the EFL League One, where he played in the Premier Academy League and FA Youth Cup. In 2009, Stambolziev joined Super League Greece club Panathinaikos before playing in three of Greece's four professional league's in the Greek football league system. Between 2012 and 2014, he made over 50 appearances in Cypriot football and also played in the 2016 AFC Champions League for Sydney FC. He later returned to Cypriot football to reach the quarter-finals of the 2017–18 Cypriot Cup with PAEEK. He last played for National Premier Leagues Victoria 2 club Preston Lions.

Stambolziev represented Australia at under-20 level between 2008 and 2009.

== Club career ==
=== Early career ===
Stambolziev grew up in the suburb Whittlesea of Melbourne's north, where he played in the youth system of Preston Lions, eventually becoming one of few professional footballers to play at the club, such as Sasa Ognenovski, Billy Celeski and Mathew Theodore. Stambolziev was overlooked by the club's reserve-team, which saw him transfer to FFV Division 1 club Hume City in 2006, with whom he was able to play at reserve level. He was a member of Australia's European Football Institute, and travelled to England to work as a glass collector at the Walkabout in Swindon. He was then offered a trial with the U18 youth academies of Bristol City, Reading and Southend United aged fourteen. Both Bristol City and Southend United showed interest in signing him to their respective academies. Stambolziev returned to England aged sixteen with an Australian representative team which participated in a tour, again he was spotted by Bristol City and was officially offered a youth contract.

=== Bristol City ===
==== 2007–08 season ====
In 2007 Stambolziev joined the U18 Academy of English Football League One side Bristol City. On 25 August 2007, Stambolziev appeared for City's Youth Academy. He participated in the 2007–08 Premier Academy League, where Bristol City where in the Academy Group B and finish in fifth position with 38 points. On 19 September 2007, Stambolziev started in an away tie against Tottenham Hotspur in the 2007–08 Premier Academy League at South Spurs Lodge. Stambolziev put an effort over the bar in the second half as Bristol City were defeated 3–1. Stambolziev played in successive games for the Academy in September, October and November, making his last appearance for 2007 on 15 December. Bristol City's U18 squad also participated in the 2007–08 FA Youth Cup, during which Stambolziev scored a double (including a last-gasp winner) against Leeds United U18 in a 2–1 win on 16 January 2008. He opened the scoring early before Sam Jerome equalised in the 78th minute, then Stambolziev scored with the last kick of the game. The win sent Bristol City into the Round of 16 stage of the competition, where they would face Manchester City U18, as Stambolziev eventually earned the nickname of Bristol City's very own 'Wizard of Oz' by the English media. He continued to appear for the Academy side during January and February 2008. On 25 March 2008, Stambolziev played for Bristol City's reserve team. On 1 April 2008, Stambolziev made his last appearance of the 2007–08 season for the club's reserve team. The game was his last appearance until July 2008.

==== 2008–09 season ====
In July 2008, Stambolziev and teammates Tom Bradley and striker Marlon Jackson played in a 2–0 away victory for Bristol City's Academy against Cirencester Town at the Corinium Stadium before the start of the 2008–09 season. Stambolziev controlled a cross from Andy Minturn and had his shot narrowly clearing the bar, before scoring from a ball given over the Cirencester Town back line in the last four minutes of the game. In August 2008, Stambolziev attracted an invitation to join an 18-man squad for an Australia national youth team training camp in Canberra. On 20 September 2008, Stambolziev played for City's Academy in a 4–1 home victory against Chelsea's Academy at the Failand Training Ground in Bristol, scoring one goal against Chelsea goalkeeper Jan Sebek. He played as a left-midfielder under coach John Clayton and was replaced in the 70th minute for Jack Neagle. Stambolziev played against Chelsea players like Daniel Philliskirk, Billy-Joe King, Marko Mitrovic, Fabio Borini, Jordan Tabor and Frank Nouble. Stambolziev appeared again for the Academy team on 27 September 2008. On 8 October 2008, Stambolziev played for the club's reserve team. On 22 November 2008, Stambolziev played in another tie for the club's Academy team. On 11 December 2008, Stambolziev made his last appearance of 2008 in the Third round of the 2008–09 FA Youth Cup for the club's Academy team against Queens Park Rangers U18, during which Stambolziev scored one of three goals for Bristol City to lead 3–0 in the second half before QPR came back to win 5–3 in extra time from a hat-trick by Josh Parker. In the second half of extra-time, Stambolziev received his second yellow card for a challenge on Christian Nanetti. Stambolziev trained with the club's first-team towards the end of 2008. On 31 January 2009, Stambolziev played for the club's Academy team. He made successive appearances for the reserve team in February, March and April. Stambolziev made his final Bristol City appearance in a reserves game on 6 May 2009. Bristol City U18 would finish in sixth position of the Academy Group B of the 2008–09 Premier Academy League with a total of 33 points, during which Stambolziev scored 9 goals in 23 league appearances. In April 2009, it was announced that Stambolziev was offered and signed a first-team contract. He was one of four academy graduates to eventually be offered a contract, with teammates Marlonon Jackson, Ashley Kington and Joe Edwards. On 11 June 2009, Sky Sports reported that Stambolziev had turned down a four figured contract in favour of joining a club in Greece.

Following his departure, Stambolziev went on to be one of few Bristol City Academy graduates to make over 100 appearances in football.

=== Panathinaikos ===
==== 2009–2010 season ====
On 22 June 2009, it was reported that Stambolziev was close to signing for Panathinaikos. He subsequently signed with the club's Academy team. In July 2009, Stambolziev attended pre-season training with the Panathinaikos first-team in Switzerland, sharing the sessions with players like Djibril Cisse, Kostas Katsouranis, Giorgos Karagounis, Marcelo Matos and Sebastian Leto. He was roommates with Giorgos Machlelis (who would go on to play alongside him for Niki Volos in 2014). Stambolziev was a member of the first-team for the 2009–2010 season, subsequently appearing for the club's first-team in a pre-season friendly before he was loaned to newly promoted Super League Greece club Kavala in July 2009.

==== Loan to Kavala ====
Stambolziev joined Australians Zeljko Kalac, Craig Moore, Andreas Govas and Apostolos Giannou during his loan at Kavala. Stambolziev put in a good performance in his first match for Kavala in a friendly against Atromitos. Greece's Sport 24 subsequently considered Stambolziev an excellent talent. On 29 August 2009, Stambolziev was an unused substitute for Kavala.

In January 2010, Stambolziev returned to Panathinaikos when he joined teammate Academy players, including Lando Fusu, in first-team training.

==== 2010–2011 season ====
On 23 July 2010, Stambolziev was included in the first-team for a friendly against West Ham United. On 13 August 2010, Stambolziev appeared in another friendly game for Panathinaikos. He remained a first-team member for the 2010–11 Super League Greece season. In March 2011, he sustained an injury. Prior to the 2011–12 season, he joined Birmingham City on trial, playing on the left-wing in a 1–1 draw in a friendly against Worcester City in July. He also trialled with Stoke City, participating in a friendly match against Newcastle Town which saw him score the first goal of Stoke's respective 6–0 win on 20 July 2011. He again played for Stoke City in a 1–0 friendly loss to Aldershot Town on 23 July. On 23 August 2011, Stambolziev trialled for former club Bristol City, playing in a 4–0 friendly win against Reading.

Stambolziev did not find his way into the Panathinaikos first-team, and it was announced in September 2011 that he would join the ranks of AO Proodeftiki Nikea from Panathinaikos for the 2011–12 season.

=== Lower leagues in Greece and stints in Cyprus (2011–2014) ===
==== AO Proodeftiki Nikea ====
In September 2011 Stambolziev signed a one-year contract with Gamma Ethniki side AO Proodeftiki. Stambolziev's first league appearance in the 2011–12 Football League 2 season came in a 1–1 home draw against Kalamata on 27 November, Stambolziev had been substituted onto the field in the 60th minute. He debuted in the 2011–12 Greek Football Cup in a 5–0 loss to Asteras Tripolis, where he was substituted onto the field in the 68th minute.

==== Thrasyvoulos Fylis ====
In January 2012 Stamvbolziev was transferred to Greek Football League side Thrasyvoulos for the remainder of the 2011–12 season. Stambolziev debuted for Thrasyvoulos in the 2011–12 Greek Football Cup, in a 3–0 loss against Olympiacos on 11 January. His first league appearance came in a 2–1 away win against Panserraikos on 14 January, where Stambolziev had scored Thrasyvoulos first goal after 16 minutes.

==== Olympiakos Nicosia ====
In July 2012, Stambolziev signed with Cypriot First Division side Olympiakos Nicosia on a free transfer for the 2012–13 season.

==== AEK Kouklia ====
Stambolziev signed for AEK Kouklia for the 2013–14 season. He scored in his debut.

=== Niki Volos ===
On 21 June 2014, it was reported that Stambolziev had joined newly promoted Super League Greece club Niki Volos, who had finished in first place of the 2013–14 Football League play-offs, for the 2014–15 Super League Greece. Stambolziev arrived at the club alongside former teammate Giorgos Machlelis, and also Giorgos Niklitsiotis. It was the first time in three seasons that Stambolziev would return to Greece's respective Super League, having previously been present at Panathinaikos until the conclusion of the 2010–11 season.

=== Sydney FC ===
On 21 January 2015, Stambolziev signed for Sydney FC as an injury replacement for Corey Gameiro. Stambolziev scored the winning goal in a 4–3 win against Newcastle Jets. On 3 June 2015, a squad listing of Sydney FC's retained players was released with the absence of Stambolziev's name, and it was thought that he would no longer remain at the club. However, on 16 June 2015, it was announced that he had signed a new one-year contract that would keep him at Sydney FC until the end of the 2015–16 season. At the conclusion of the season he was not offered a new contract.

=== Kidderminster Harriers ===
On 5 August 2016, Stambolziev signed for Kidderminster Harriers. He joined after a successful trial period, exciting all that saw him play in the 2016–17 pre-season friendlies. He was on trial for six weeks before signing a one-year deal. On 29 August 2016, Stambolziev was a used substitute for Kidderminster Harriers. On 7 September, Stambolziev was a used substitute for the first-team. On 29 October, he was an un-used substitute in a first-team game. In November 2016, Stambolziev was an un-used substitute in a 2–0 away defeat against Blackpool, before being released by the club in the same month.

=== PAEEK ===
In January 2017, Robert Stambolziev signed with Cypriot Second Division side PAEEK on a short-term deal until the end of the 2016–17 season. On 28 January 2017, Stambolziev appeared in the starting lineup and scored a double for his new club. On 25 February 2017, Stambolziev appeared in the starting lineup and scored. On 4 March 2017, Stambolziev scored another double for his club.

=== Preston Lions ===
In April 2017, Stambolziev joined former club Preston Lions in Victorian State League Division 1, Australia's regionalised third division. On 28 May 2017, he scored a hat-trick on his debut against Western Suburbs as Preston Lions came back from trailing to win the fixture 3–2. One week later, Stambolziev scored another hat-trick against Yarraville as Preston Lions again came back from behind to win the fixture 3–0 on 3 June 2017. One more fixture went by and Stambolziev would score a double for Preston Lions as they defeated Westgate 7–0 on 11 June 2017, totalling to eight goals in three consecutive appearances. He scored nine goals in eight matches before making his last appearance for the club on 16 July 2017.

=== PAEEK ===
Stambolziev returned to PAEEK for the 2017–18 season, where he reached the quarter-finals of the Cypriot Cup.

=== Altona Magic ===
On 27 May 2017, a day before the opening of the mid-season transfer window, National Premier Leagues Victoria 2 club Altona Magic SC announced the signing of Stambolziev for the remainder of the season. Stambolziev scored his first Magic goal on 10 June 2018, the first in a 2–1 win over Werribee City FC.

== International career ==
In July 2008, Stambolziev was listed in a group of Australian footballers aged between 16 and 22 known as "the lost boys", including Paul Giannou, Andreas Govas and Dean Bouzanis, who were likely to play for or had played for national teams of the country of their heritage. In August 2008, Stambolziev was invited to join an 18-man squad for an Australia national youth team training camp in Canberra. In May 2009, Stambolziev was selected for Australia's national youth team to play a series of friendlies in a tournament in Terborg against youth teams including De Graafschap, Valencia CF, Atletico Mineiro, Egypt U-20, PSV Eindhoven, Ajax Amsterdam, Celtic, FC Uitgeest, and Vitesse as part of the under-20 national team's preparation for the 2009 FIFA U-20 World Cup. Before the Ternborg Tournament, Stambolziev scored a double against FC Twente U19 in a 2-0 friendly win scoring in the 8th minute and 19th minute of the match. Stambolziev was ultimately not selected to take part at the U-20 World Cup, stating that the Australia's national youth teams had neglected him for selection which resulted in his interest of representing Macedonia. It had also been reported that both the Macedonian Football Federation and the Hellenic Football Federation had been chasing him. In a 2008 interview with The World Game, Stambolziev stated that he would play for either Macedonian or Greece upon selection. In August 2014, Stambolziev revealed that he had chosen to represent Macedonia.

== Personal life ==
Stambolziev is of Macedonian descent. He was an alumni at St. Monica's College in Melbourne.

== Honours ==
Australia U20

- Under-20 International Cor Groenewegen Tournament: 2009
