= Jason Mooney (Northern Irish footballer) =

Northern Irish footballer (born 1989)

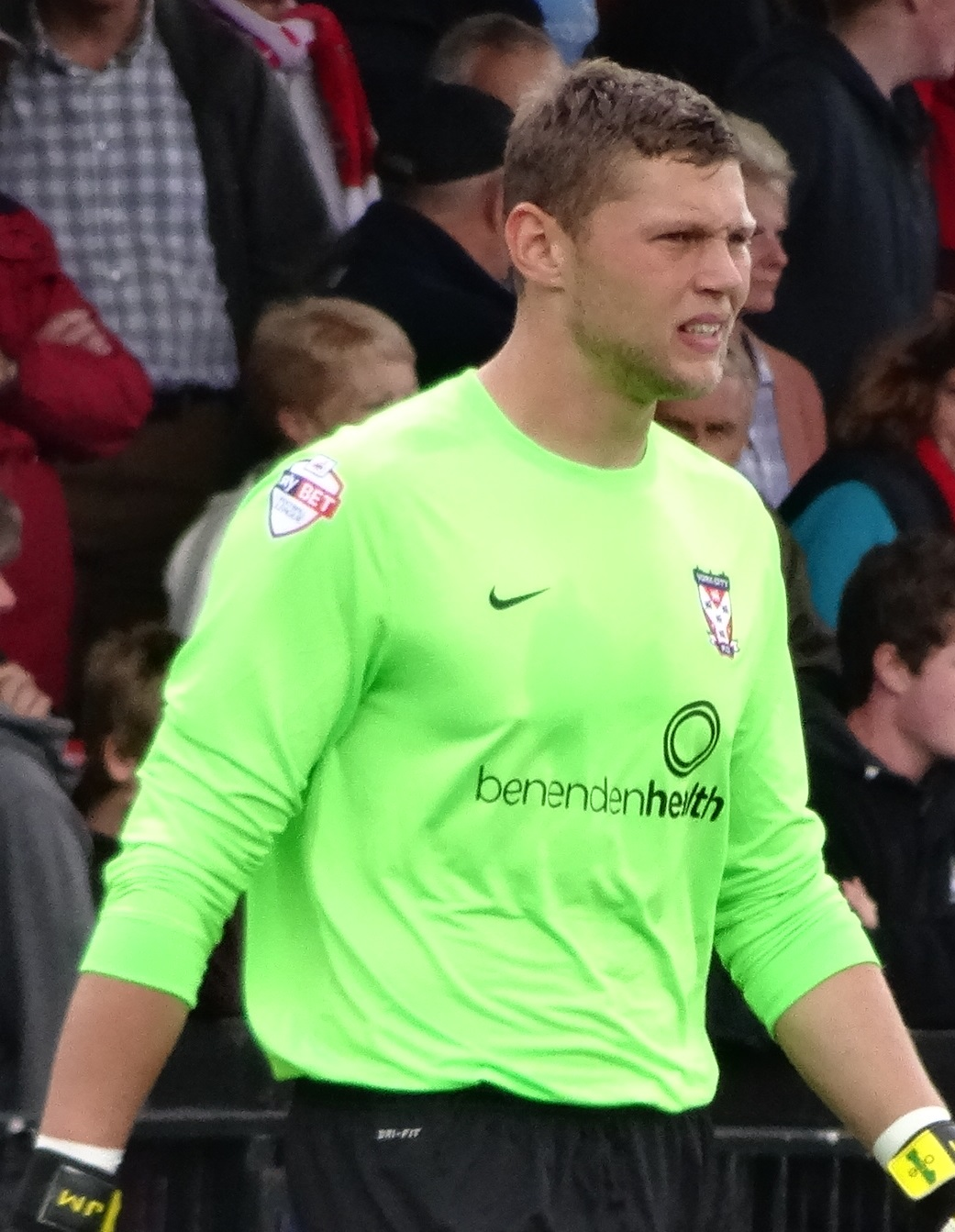
- Mooney playing for York City in 2014

Personal information
- Full name: Jason Bryan Mooney
- Date of birth: 26 February 1989 (age 37)
- Place of birth: Newtownards, Northern Ireland
- Height: 6 ft 8 1/2 in (2.04 m)
- Position: Goalkeeper

Team information
- Current team: Donaghadee

Youth career
- –2007: Ards

Senior career*
Years	Team	Apps	(Gls)
2007–2008	Ards	3	(0)
2008–2009	Bangor		
2009	Ards Rangers		
2009–2011	Comber Recreation		
2011–2012	Wycombe Wanderers	0	(0)
2011–2012	→ Oxford City (loan)	35	(0)
2012–2014	Tranmere Rovers	4	(0)
2014–2015	York City	4	(0)
2015	→ Alfreton Town (loan)	13	(0)
2015–2016	Accrington Stanley	26	(0)
2016–2018	Cliftonville	11	(0)
2018–2019	Ards		(0)
2019–?	Donaghadee FC		
- * Club domestic league appearances and goals as of 22:26, 23 July 2020 (UTC)

Jason Bryan Mooney (born 26 February 1989) is a Northern Irish semi-professional footballer who plays as a goalkeeper.

== Career ==
Born in Newtownards, County Down, Mooney worked various jobs including as a gardener, at a car wash and at a farm while playing in Northern Ireland. He started his football career with Ards's youth system, with whom he won the Youth League Cup in April 2008. His debut for the first team came before that, as he started a 2–1 away defeat to Carrick Rangers in the Irish First Division on 29 December 2007. Mooney made three appearances for Ards in the 2007–08 season, before signing for newly promoted IFA Premiership club Bangor in the summer of 2008. He had a spell with Ards Rangers before joining Comber Recreation (both of the Northern Amateur Football League) over the summer of 2009.

Mooney took part in a goalkeeping course in the south of England during the summer of 2011, which was attended by scouts from across England. He signed a one-year contract with English League One club Wycombe Wanderers in August 2011 after impressing during a two-month trial. He had earlier signed non-contract terms after working for the club as a barman. Mooney spent the 2011–12 season on loan at Southern League Premier Division club Oxford City, and helped the club to win promotion into the Conference North with a 4–2 play-off final victory over AFC Totton. He made 45 appearances for City, but was released by Wycombe in May 2012 following their relegation into League Two.

Mooney had trials with Conference Premier club Cambridge United and League One club Tranmere Rovers before joining the latter on a one-year contract in July 2012 as back-up for Owain Fôn Williams. He made his debut on 27 April 2013, in a 0–0 home draw with Bournemouth – his clean sheet helped to deny the visitors the League One title on the last day of 2012–13. Mooney signed a new one-year contract in June 2013 and manager Ronnie Moore commented that "Jason has really progressed and I'm pleased he will be staying with us". He made three appearances in 2013–14, which culminated in Tranmere's relegation to League Two.

Mooney turned down a new contract with Tranmere to sign for League Two club York City on 29 May 2014 on a two-year contract. He made his debut in York's 1–1 away draw with his former club Tranmere in the opening match of 2014–15 on 9 August 2014. Having made only five appearances for York, he joined Conference Premier club Alfreton Town for the rest of the season on 17 January 2015. Mooney made 13 appearances for Alfreton before being recalled by York on 3 April 2015 after Bobby Olejnik was suspended.

Mooney was released by York by mutual consent ahead of a transfer to their League Two rivals Accrington Stanley on 1 July 2015 on a one-year contract.

== Career statistics ==
As of match played 1 October 2016

Appearances and goals by club, season and competition
Club	Season	League			National Cup		League Cup		Other		Total	
Club	Season	Division	Apps	Goals	Apps	Goals	Apps	Goals	Apps	Goals	Apps	Goals
Ards	2007–08	Irish First Division	3	0	—		0	0	0	0	3	0
Oxford City (loan)	2011–12	Southern League Premier Division	35	0	5	0	—		5 (Note: One appearance in Southern League Cup, two in Oxfordshire Senior Cup, two in Southern League Premier Division play-offs)	0	45	0
Tranmere Rovers	2012–13	League One	1	0	0	0	0	0	0	0	1	0
Tranmere Rovers	2013–14	League One	3	0	0	0	0	0	0	0	3	0
Tranmere Rovers	Total		4	0	0	0	0	0	0	0	4	0
York City	2014–15	League Two	4	0	0	0	1	0	0	0	5	0
Alfreton Town	2014–15	Conference Premier	13	0	—		—		—		13	0
Accrington Stanley	2015–16	League Two	26	0	2	0	1	0	0	0	29	0
Cliftonville	2016–17	NIFL Premiership	9	0	0	0	0	0	—		9	0
Career total			94	0	7	0	2	0	5	0	108	0

== Honours ==
Oxford City

- Southern League Premier Division play-offs: 2011–12
