= Cameron Murray (footballer) =

English footballer (born 1995)

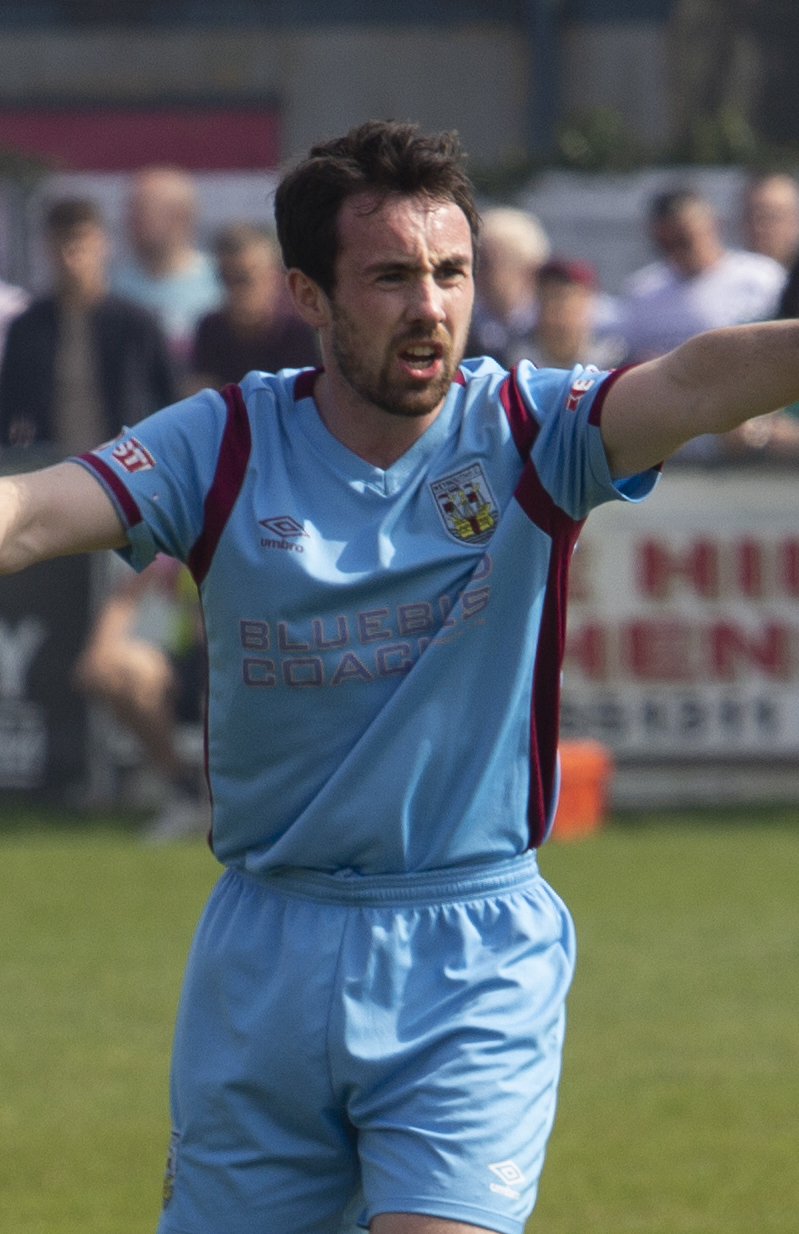
- Murray playing for Weymouth in 2019

Personal information
- Full name: Cameron Lochiel Murray
- Date of birth: 21 March 1995 (age 31)
- Place of birth: Halifax, England
- Height: 5 ft 6 in (1.68 m)
- Position: Midfielder

Team information
- Current team: Dorchester Town
- Number: 15

Youth career
- Leeds United
- Bradford City
- 2012–2013: York City

Senior career*
Years	Team	Apps	(Gls)
2013–2015	York City	0	(0)
2014–2015	→ Frickley Athletic (loan)	1	(0)
2015	Scarborough Athletic	7	(0)
2015–2016	F.C. United of Manchester	4	(0)
2016	Stalybridge Celtic	1	(0)
2016–2017	Scarborough Athletic		
2017	Tadcaster Albion		
2017	Farsley Celtic		
2018–2019	Dorchester Town	21	(5)
2019–2023	Weymouth	112	(8)
2022–2023	Poole Town (loan)	22	(1)
2023–2024	Poole Town	41	(2)
2024–2025	Gosport Borough	41	(2)
2025–2026	Dorchester Town	35	(0)
- * Club domestic league appearances and goals as of 15:54, 3 June 2026 (UTC)

Cameron Lochiel Murray (born 21 March 1995) is a semi-professional footballer who plays as a midfielder. He is currently unattached having left Southern League club Dorchester Town in June 2026. He started his senior career with York City in 2013.

== Club career ==
Murray was born in Halifax, West Yorkshire and attended Brighouse High School. He played in the youth team of Leeds United aged six to nine and Bradford City aged 10 to 15. Murray moved to Spain on a scholarship in September 2011, before returning to England in May 2012 after fracturing his clavicle He subsequently joined York City's youth team. He made his first-team debut at the age of 18 as a 75th-minute substitute for Tom Platt in York's 3–0 home defeat to Rotherham United in the second round of the Football League Trophy on 8 October 2013. Murray signed a one-and-a-half-year professional contract with York in January 2014. He joined Northern Premier League Premier Division club Frickley Athletic on 19 December on a one-month loan and made one start before returning to York on 20 January 2015.

Murray joined Scarborough Athletic of the Northern Premier League Division One North on 5 February 2015 after having his contract with York cancelled by mutual consent. He signed for National League North club F.C. United of Manchester on 7 August after impressing on trial during the summer. He signed for their divisional rivals Stalybridge Celtic in January 2016. Murray returned to former club Scarborough Athletic in October. He signed for Dorchester Town on 9 August 2018, having played with the club since the pre-season.

Murray signed for rivals Weymouth on 14 January 2019, and made 124 appearances, scoring eight goals, over the next five years.

In November 2022 Murray joined Poole Town on loan, initially for one month before returning for a second loan in February 2023.

Murray joined Poole permanently in the summer of 2023 and made 46 appearances across all competitions in the 2023/2024 season. The following season he signed for Gosport Borough, making 51 appearances for the Hampshire side.

In June 2025, Murray returned to Dorchester and featured in 39 matches across the 2025/26. Following the club's relegation, he departed the Magpies in June 2026.

== International career ==
Despite being born in England, Murray was called up for a Scotland under-15 training camp in April 2010.

== Career statistics ==
As of match played 9 January 2016

Appearances and goals by club, season and competition
Club	Season	League			FA Cup		League Cup		Other		Total	
Club	Season	Division	Apps	Goals	Apps	Goals	Apps	Goals	Apps	Goals	Apps	Goals
York City	2013–14	League Two	0	0	0	0	0	0	1 (Note: Appearance in Football League Trophy)	0	1	0
York City	2014–15	League Two	0	0	0	0	0	0	0	0	0	0
York City	Total		0	0	0	0	0	0	1	0	1	0
F.C. United of Manchester	2015–16	National League North	4	0	1	0	—		2 (Note: Appearances in Manchester Premier Cup)	1	7	1
Stalybridge Celtic	2015–16	National League North	1	0	—		—		—		1	0
Career total			5	0	1	0	0	0	3	1	9	1
