= 2014–15 York City F.C. season =

Association football club season

York City F.C.
2014–15 season
- Chairman: Jason McGill
- Manager: Nigel Worthington (until 13 October 2014); Steve Torpey (caretaker, from 13 October 2014 to 15 October 2014); Russ Wilcox (from 15 October 2014)
- Ground: Bootham Crescent
- League Two: 18th
- FA Cup: First round (eliminated by AFC Wimbledon)
- League Cup: First round (eliminated by Doncaster Rovers)
- Football League Trophy: First round (eliminated by Barnsley)
- Top goalscorer: League: Jake Hyde (9); All: Jake Hyde (10)
- Highest home attendance: 5,424 vs Hartlepool United, League Two, 11 April 2015
- Lowest home attendance: 2,085 vs AFC Wimbledon, FA Cup, 8 November 2014
- Average home league attendance: 3,555
Home colours	Away colours

The 2014–15 season was the 93rd season of competitive association football and 78th season in the Football League played by York City Football Club, a professional football club based in York, North Yorkshire, England. Their seventh-place finish in 2013–14 and loss to Fleetwood Town in the play-offs meant it was their third successive season in League Two. The season ran from 1 July 2014 to 30 June 2015.

Nigel Worthington made eight signings in his second summer transfer window as York manager. With the team only one place above the relegation zone by mid October 2014, Worthington resigned and was replaced by former Scunthorpe United manager Russ Wilcox. After a six-match unbeaten run from late March to mid April 2015, York ensured survival from relegation before finishing in 18th position in the 24-team 2014–15 League Two. York were knocked out of the 2014–15 FA Cup, League Cup and Football League Trophy in their opening round matches.

32 players made at least one appearance in nationally organised first-team competition, and there were 13 different goalscorers. Defender Keith Lowe missed only one of the 50 first-team matches over the season. Jake Hyde finished as leading scorer with 10 goals, of which nine came in league competition and one came in the FA Cup. The winner of the Clubman of the Year award, voted for by the club's supporters, was Lowe.

== Background and pre-season ==
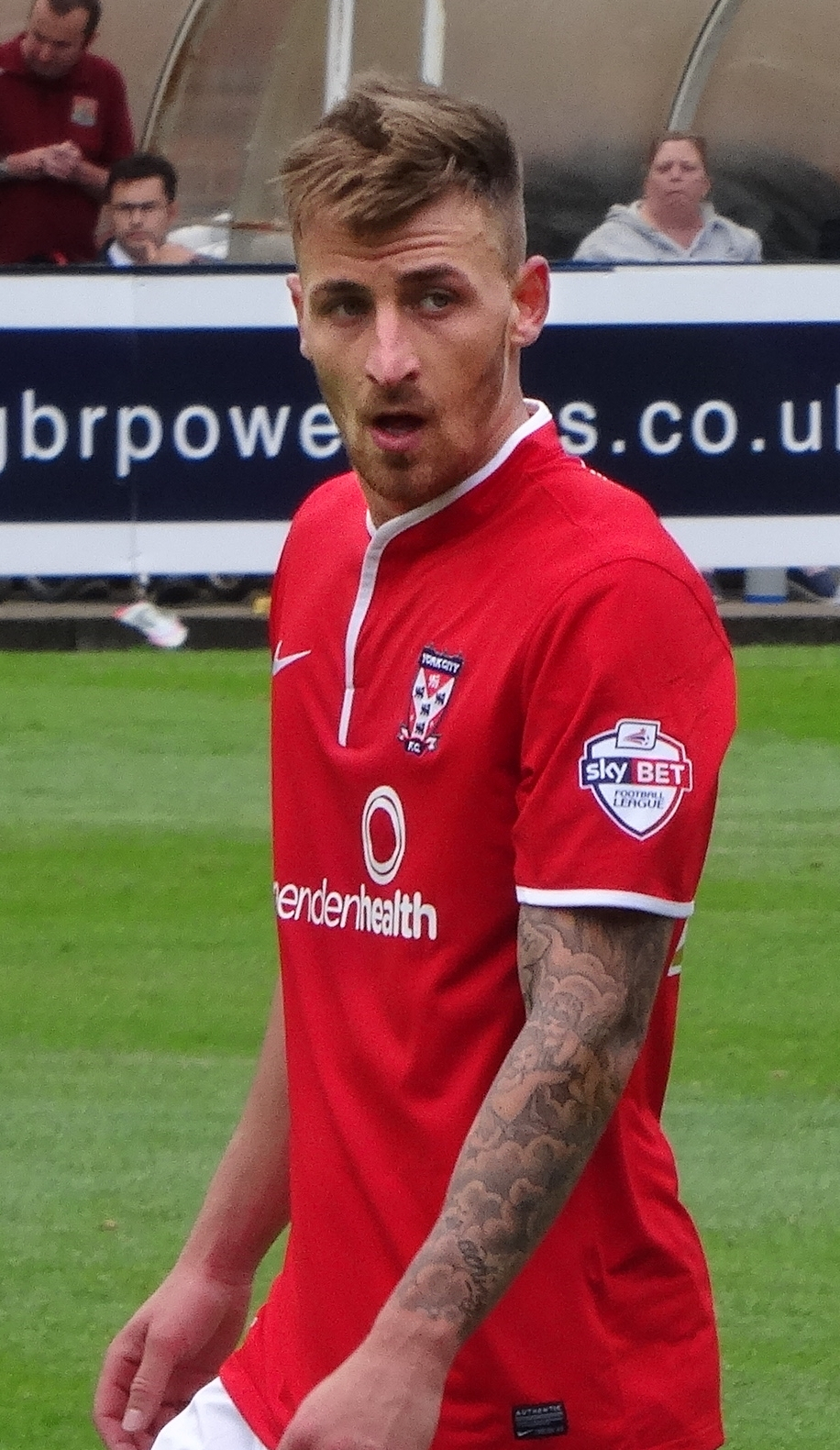
Jake Hyde, a summer signing from Barnet, was York City's top scorer with 10 goals.

The 2013–14 season was Nigel Worthington's first full season as manager of York City, after leading the team to safety from relegation in 2012–13 following his appointment in March 2013. Having only been above the relegation zone on goal difference come the start of 2014, the team went on a 17-match unbeaten run from February onwards. This saw York reach the play-offs with a seventh-place finish in the 2013–14 League Two table. York were beaten 1–0 on aggregate by Fleetwood Town in the play-off semi-final, the decisive goal being scored by former York player Matty Blair at home in the first leg.

After 2013–14 ended York released Tom Allan, Calvin Andrew, Chris Dickinson, Shaquille McDonald, Sander Puri and Adam Reed, with David McGurk retiring from professional football. Ryan Bowman and Lanre Oyebanjo left the club to sign for Torquay United and Crawley Town respectively, but Michael Coulson signed a new contract. Worthington made eight signings before the season kicked off, those being goalkeeper Jason Mooney from Tranmere Rovers, defenders Femi Ilesanmi from Dagenham & Redbridge, Marvin McCoy from Wycombe Wanderers and Dave Winfield from Shrewsbury Town, midfielders Lindon Meikle from Mansfield Town, Anthony Straker from Southend United and Luke Summerfield from Shrewsbury, and striker Jake Hyde from Barnet.

New home and away kits were brought in for the first time in two years. The home kit included red shirts with a white collar and white trims on the sleeves, white shorts and red socks. The away kit comprised light blue shirts with a white collar, a white double-chevron decoration at the top and white sleeves, light blue shirts and light blue socks. Benenden Health continued as shirt sponsors for the third successive season.

Pre-season match details
Date	Opponents	Venue	Result	Score F–A	Scorers	Attendance	Ref.
12 July 2014	Sheffield Wednesday	H	L	0–2		3,312	
15 July 2014	Raith Rovers	A	W	4–0	Coulson 5', Winfield 25', Straker 34', Hyde 65'	838	
19 July 2014	St Johnstone	A	D	0–0		944	
23 July 2014	Hull City	H	L	0–2		2,301	
30 July 2014	Nottingham Forest	H	L	1–2	Platt 51'	1,714	
2 August 2014	Sheffield United	H	W	2–0	Jarvis (2) 56', 69'	1,761	

== Review ==
=== August ===
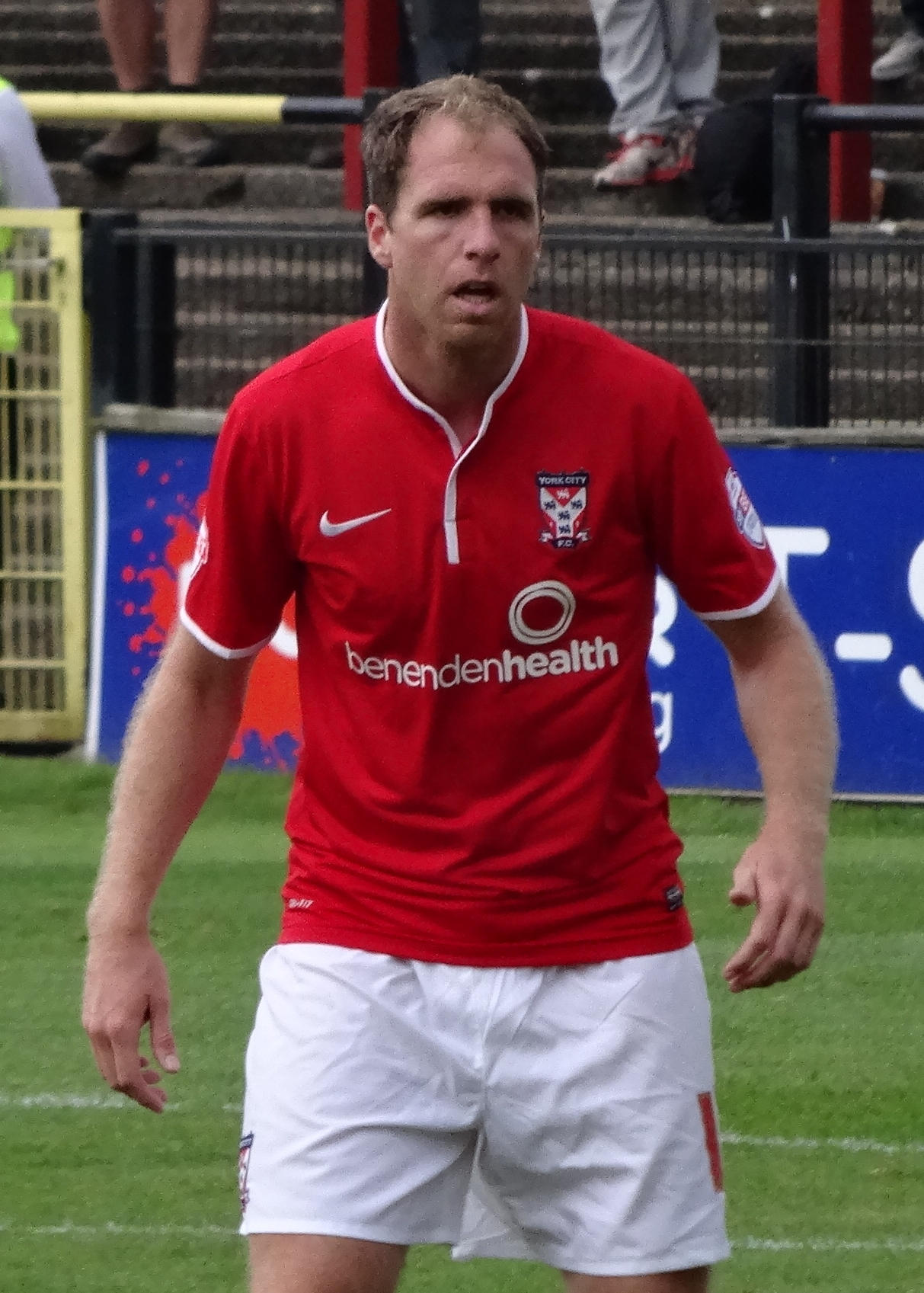
Keith Lowe scored York's first goal of the season.

York started the season by playing away to Tranmere Rovers, who were new to League Two after being relegated from League One after 2013–14. Keith Lowe gave York the lead with a header from Meikle's corner in the 67th minute, before Tranmere equalised through James Rowe in stoppage time as the match ended a 1–1 draw. This was followed by a 1–0 home defeat to Doncaster Rovers in the first round of the League Cup, after Harry Forrester scored for the League One team in stoppage time. Hyde scored from a Straker corner on his debut to give York the lead over Northampton Town in a home match, before the visitors made the score 1–1 in the 90th minute from a Marc Richards free kick. Cambridge United took a two-goal lead at York, before Hyde scored a header shortly before half-time and Wes Fletcher scored a penalty in the 83rd minute, seeing the match end a 2–2 draw. York then played away to Exeter City, who were also without a win this season, and drew 1–1; Exeter took the lead in the eighth minute before Lowe equalised with a header from a Summerfield corner in the 82nd minute. August ended with a fifth successive league draw after York were held 0–0 at home by Wycombe Wanderers, who had won three of their first four league matches.

=== September ===
York were knocked out of the Football League Trophy in the first round after being beaten 2–0 away by Barnsley, with the League One team scoring twice in the second half. Their first win of the season came after beating Stevenage 3–2 away. Coulson and Fletcher scored in the first half for York before Stevenage levelled the score after the break, and Fletcher scored the winning goal with a 75th-minute penalty. This was followed by York's first league defeat of the season, losing 2–0 away to league leaders Burton Albion. Goalkeeper Michael Ingham made four excellent saves in York's 0–0 draw at home to Luton Town. Daniel Parslow was loaned to Conference Premier club Grimsby Town for one month, having failed to appear in the team after recovering from a long-term injury. York played Southend United at home, who took the lead early in the first half before Russell Penn equalised in first half stoppage time. The visitors scored twice during the second half before Winfield scored a consolation goal in the 85th minute, seeing the match finish a 3–2 defeat. York lost the second match in succession for the first time in 2014–15 after being beaten 2–0 away to Dagenham & Redbridge, the home team scoring in each half through Joss Labadie. Striker Ryan Brunt was signed on a one-month loan from Conference Premier club Bristol Rovers, with York's existing strikers having failed to score in five of the last seven matches.

=== October ===
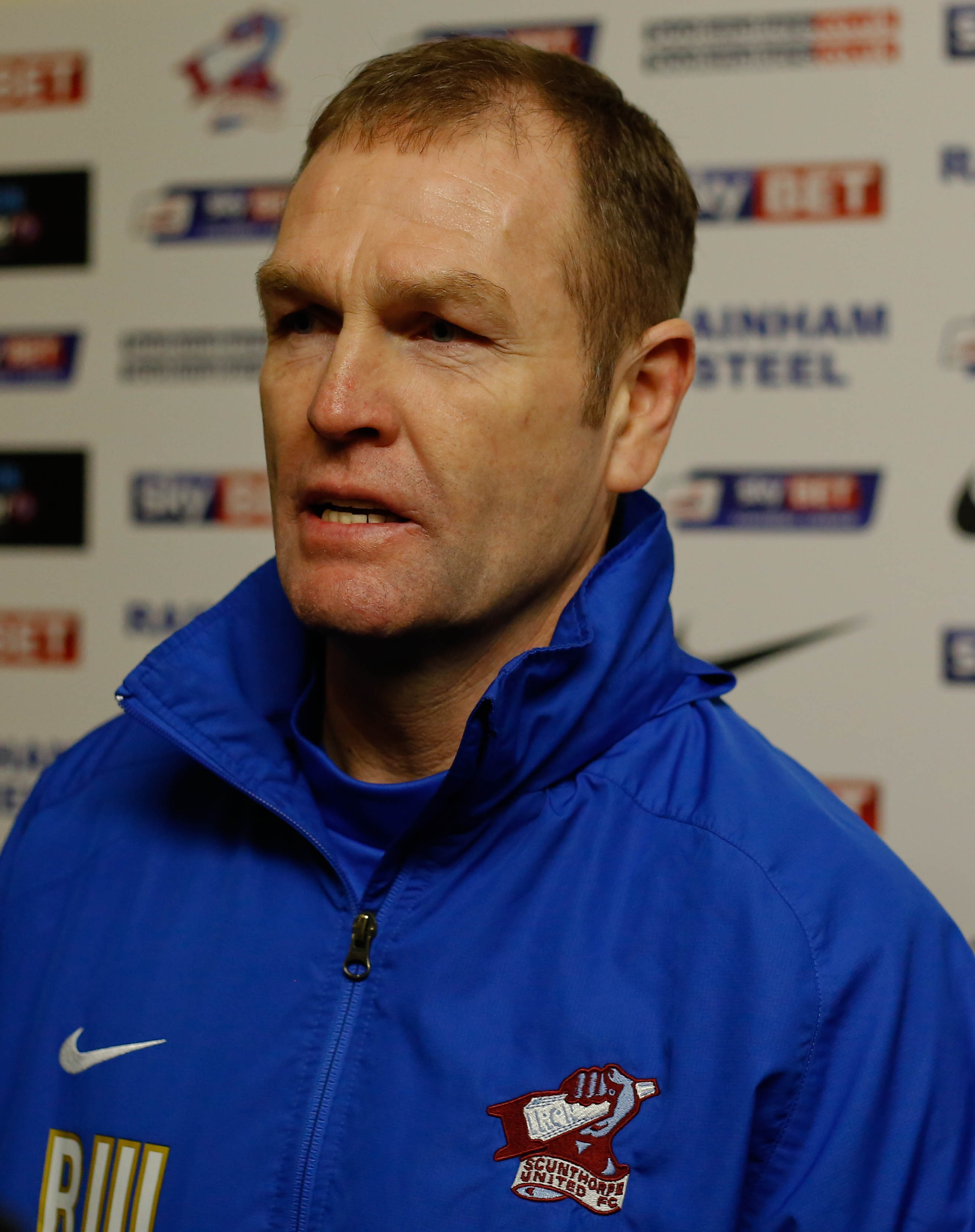
Russ Wilcox was appointed as manager after Nigel Worthington resigned.

York's run of two straight losses ended after drawing 0–0 at home to Portsmouth, in which Brunt missed a header from four yards in the third minute of stoppage time. Sheffield United's 19-year-old striker Diego De Girolamo, an Italy under-20 international, joined on a one-month youth loan as a result of injuries to Coulson, Fletcher and Hyde. De Girolamo scored seven minutes into his debut away to Newport County with a low finish, but after Penn was sent off for a second bookable offence the home team scored three goals in the second half, York losing the match 3–1. With York one place above the relegation zone Worthington resigned as manager, and was quoted saying "In recent weeks, performances have not been up to my high standards and I take full responsibility for this". Steve Torpey, who was Worthington's assistant manager, took over as caretaker manager before Russ Wilcox was appointed as manager two days after Worthington's departure. Wilcox had been sacked as Scunthorpe United manager a week earlier with them second from bottom in the League One table, having led them to promotion the previous season as League Two runners-up.

Wilcox's first match in charge was a 1–0 home defeat to Shrewsbury Town, who scored their goal in the 87th minute through James Collins, and this result saw York move into the relegation zone in 23rd place. Coulson gave York a 77th-minute lead away to Morecambe with a low shot from the edge of the penalty area, before the home team equalised in stoppage time. Former Australia under-20 goalkeeper Alex Cisak was signed on a one-month loan from Premier League club Burnley. He debuted in York's 1–1 home draw with Mansfield Town, in which York took the lead in the 20th minute when De Girolamo turned and scored from close range having been set up by a Penn cross, before the away team equalised during the second half through Daniel Carr. Former Jamaica international striker Deon Burton, who played under Wilcox at Scunthorpe, was signed on a one-month loan.

=== November ===
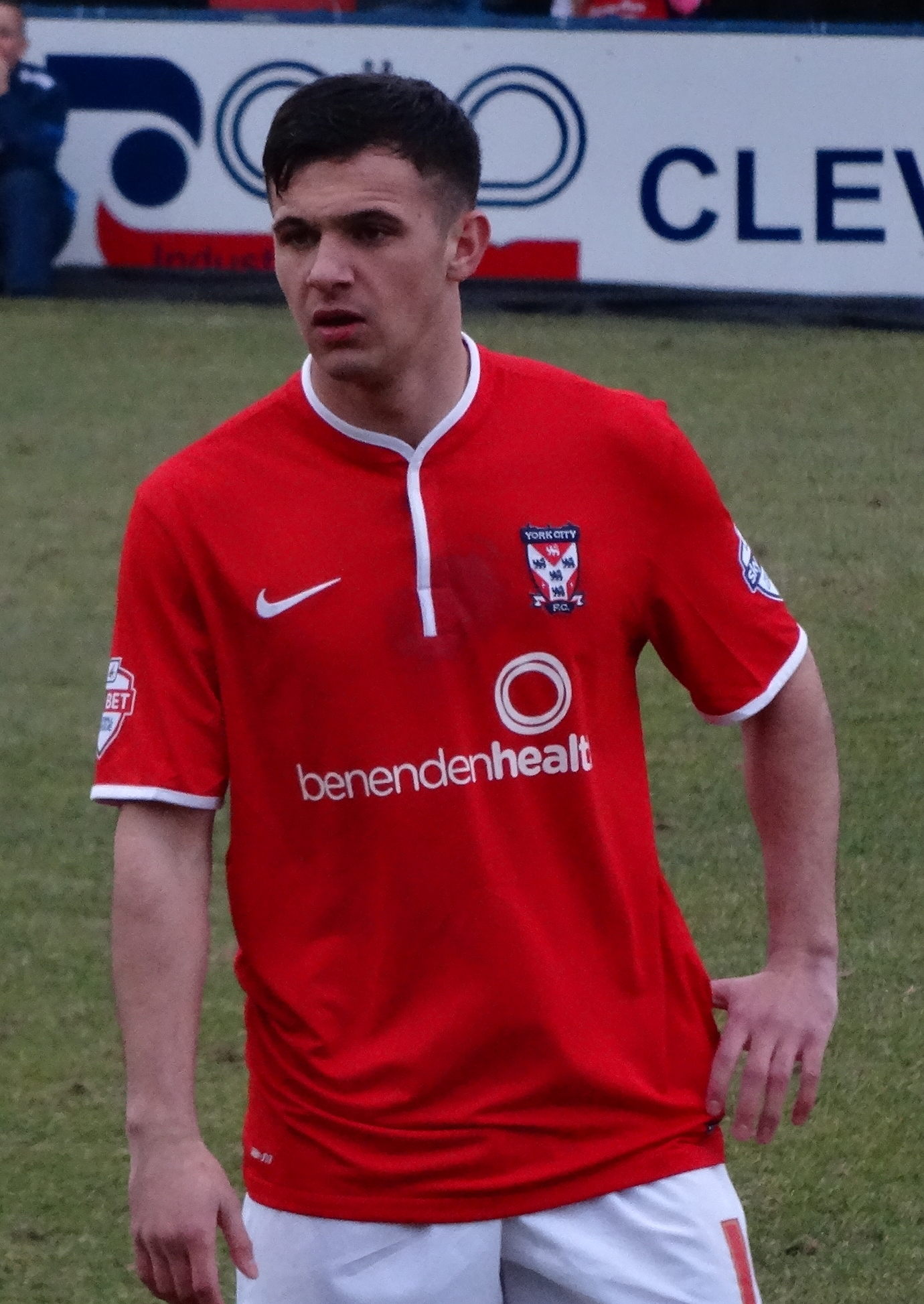
Diego De Girolamo started a second loan spell from Sheffield United in November.

York recorded their first victory since early September 2014 after winning 1–0 away against Cheltenham Town, De Girolamo scoring from a Coulson pass in the 43rd minute. De Girolamo was recalled early from his loan spell by Sheffield United as they wanted him for their two upcoming cup fixtures, after he had scored three times in four York matches. AFC Bournemouth's Guadeloupe international defender Stéphane Zubar joined on loan until 4 January 2015, with Parslow being loaned back to Grimsby until the same date. York drew 1–1 at home with their divisional rivals AFC Wimbledon in the first round of the FA Cup; Hyde gave York the lead in the eighth minute after scoring from Coulson's low cross, before Andy Frampton equalised for the away team on 22 minutes. Burton was ruled out for two to three months with a medial ligament injury suffered in this match, resulting in his loan at the club being curtailed. York signed 19-year-old Middlesbrough defender Brad Halliday on a one-month loan as cover and competition for McCoy. Fellow strugglers Oxford United won 1–0 at York, James Roberts scoring from three yards after Danny Hylton flicked on a Brian Howard corner in the 35th minute, and Wilcox surmised the result saying "The lads are working as hard as they possibly can but I'm just looking for a little bit more now".

York were knocked out of the FA Cup after losing 3–1 away to AFC Wimbledon in a first round replay; after Fletcher had given York a fifth-minute lead with a 30-yard volley the home team scored three times in the second half. In York's 3–1 away win over bottom-placed Hartlepool United the home team took the lead through Scott Fenwick in the first half, before Lowe scored two headers in the space of two minutes and Hyde scored with a shot from outside the penalty area in the second half. Cisak's loan was extended, having conceded just three goals in four appearances, while De Girolamo rejoined on a second youth loan, both until 4 January 2015. Striker Carlton Morris joined on a youth loan from Norwich City until 4 January 2015, after scoring once in 10 appearances while on loan with League Two rivals Oxford earlier in the season. Hyde scored in the fourth minute of stoppage time to give York a 1–1 draw away to Plymouth Argyle; his goal came after reacting first to goalkeeper Luke McCormick's parry of De Girolamo's header.

=== December ===
York's first fixture of the month was a 3–2 home defeat to AFC Wimbledon, who had not won away since mid August 2014, and they took the lead in the first half with a Jake Goodman goal. During the second half De Girolamo equalised with a 15-yard shot, and AFC Wimbledon scored two goals in quick succession through Sean Rigg and Matt Tubbs, before Zubar scored for York from a few yards out to finish the scoring. Halliday made his senior debut in this match, and was named man of the match with an impressive performance at right-back, before his loan was extended until 17 January 2015. Cameron Murray was loaned to Northern Premier League Premier Division club Frickley Athletic, where he made only one start during a one-month period. York went 2–0 down after 62 minutes when playing away against Bury, but fought back to draw 2–2 with Hyde scoring a header from a Coulson cross before Summerfield equalised with a 20-yard free kick. York achieved their first home win of the season by beating Accrington Stanley 1–0, meaning the club record of most home consecutive matches without a win, set at 14 in 1981–82, was not equalled. The winning goal was scored in the 35th minute by Lowe with a header from Coulson's cross. This was followed by a 3–0 away victory over Carlisle United, marking the first time York had achieved successive wins in 2014–15. Josh Carson scored shortly before half-time from Fletcher's flick on, and in the second half Summerfield scored with a curling shot from 20 yards before Coulson shot into the top corner.

=== January ===
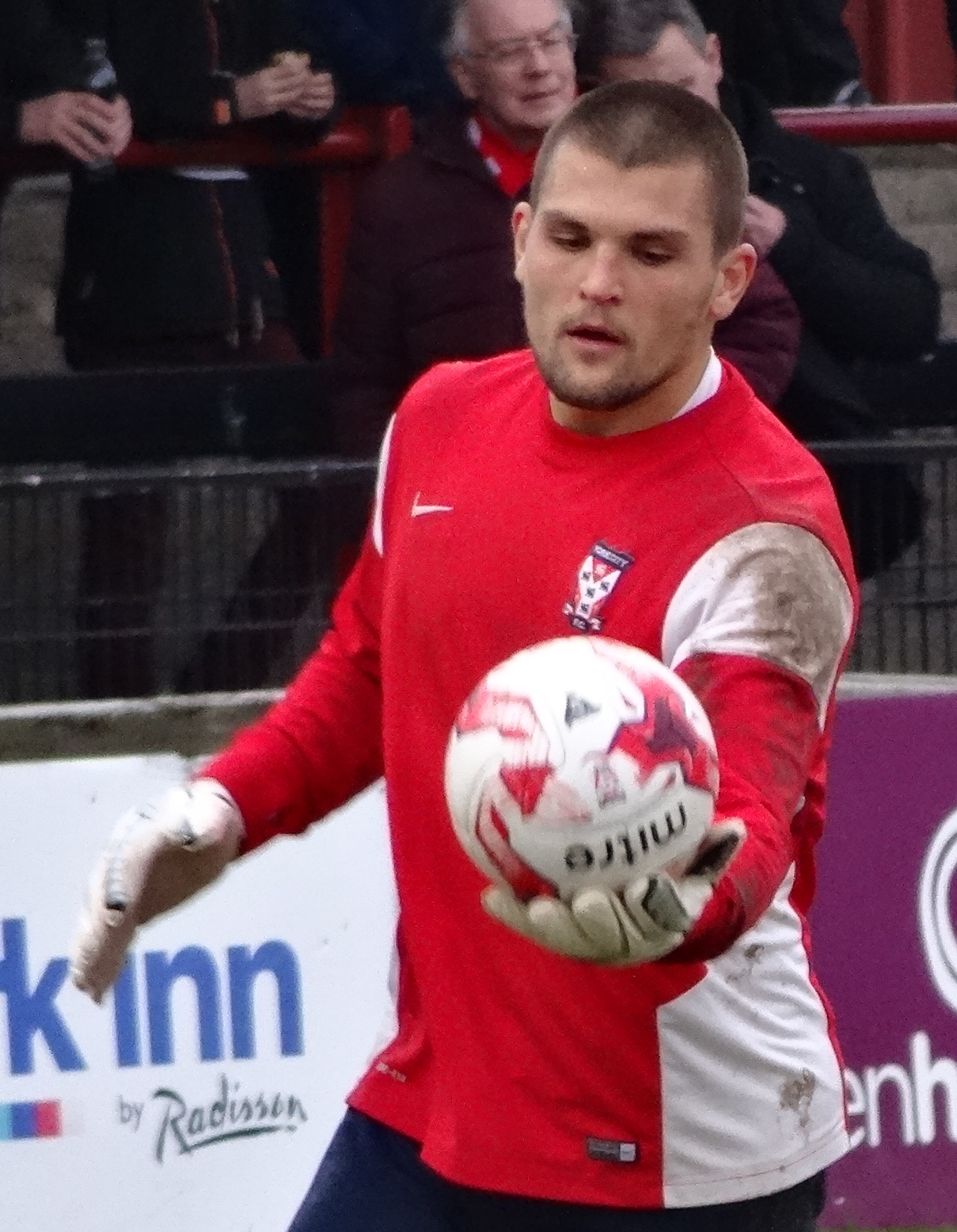
Bobby Olejnik joined from Peterborough United on loan.

York's first result of 2015 was a 0–0 home draw with Plymouth, and despite playing 70 minutes with 10 men after Zubar was sent off the team created a number of chances. Cisak was recalled by Burnley after his loan expired and York replaced him with Peterborough United's former Austria under-21 international goalkeeper Bobby Olejnik, who joined on loan for the rest of the season. After De Girolamo's loan expired Sheffield United wanted to strengthen their striking options before considering letting him return to York. Morris' loan was extended for a second month after making four substitute appearances for York, and Parslow had his loan at Grimsby extended to the end of the season. York were beaten 1–0 away to league leaders Wycombe and Olejnik made a number of saves on his debut to keep the team in the match. Zubar's loan was extended until the end of the season ahead of him starting a four-match suspension, before Jarvis was loaned to Conference Premier club Aldershot Town for the rest of the season having not played for York since October 2014.

Halliday's loan was extended for the rest of the season ahead of his return from a three-match suspension, having establish himself at right-back ahead of McCoy before his sending off against Accrington. Having made only five appearances for York, Mooney was loaned to Conference Premier club Alfreton Town for the rest of the season. York entered their home match against Stevenage with the visitors on a five-match unbeaten run, and lost 2–0 with the away team scoring in each half. Striker Emile Sinclair was signed on a one-and-a-half-year contract after having his contract at Northampton cancelled, where he had fallen down the pecking order. Walsall's Mal Benning was signed on a one-month loan to provide competition for Ilesanmi at left-back. Sinclair scored in the 70th minute of his debut against Burton with a close range finish, before the away team equalised late in the match through Adam McGurk. Straker joined Scottish Premiership club Motherwell on loan for the rest of the season having played infrequently under Wilcox. York created a number of chances away to Southend before losing 1–0, Shaq Coulthirst scoring an 88th-minute penalty.

=== February ===
Murray's contract was cancelled to allow him to join Northern Premier League Division One North club Scarborough Athletic. York dropped into the relegation zone in 23rd place after being beaten 2–0 at home by fellow strugglers Dagenham & Redbridge, who scored in each half through Jamie Cureton. Having only made appearances as a substitute during two months with York, Morris returned to Norwich after his loan expired. York took a 2–0 lead away to Luton, Carson and Sinclair scoring within five minutes of each other early in the second half. However, Hyde was sent off for a tackle on Nathan Doyle before Mark Cullen scored twice for Luton, the match finishing a 2–2 draw. Winfield, who had made only five appearances for York, signed for AFC Wimbledon on a one-month loan. York moved out of the relegation zone and above their opponents Tranmere after a 2–0 home victory, which was the team's first win in eight matches. Fletcher scored both goals in each half, the first coming after he met Halliday's low cross at the back post and the second came after collecting Coulson's pass, cutting inside and shooting into the far corner.

De Girolamo returned to York for a third youth loan spell, this time for the rest of the season, with Wilcox commenting that "it is great to get a player of his calibre back in the building". York dropped to within a point of the relegation zone after losing 3–0 away to Northampton, the home team taking the lead in the fourth minute through Chris Hackett. Brendan Moloney scored their second goal shortly after half-time, and after Olejnik saved a Marc Richards penalty Northampton finished the scoring through Ivan Toney. York were held by Exeter to a 0–0 draw at home, and stayed above the relegation zone on goal difference.

=== March ===
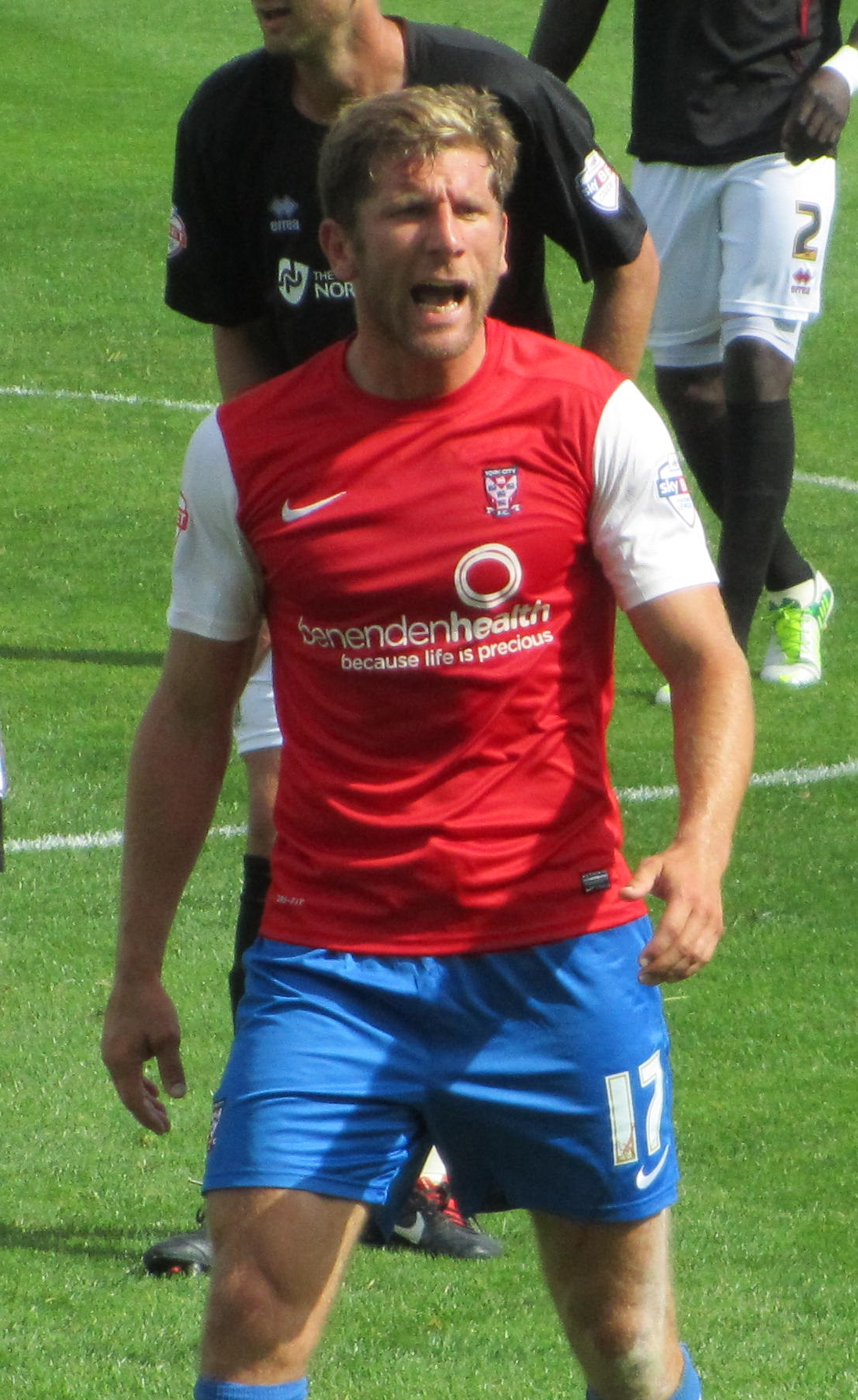
Richard Cresswell was appointed as first-team coach.

York moved two points above the relegation zone with a 3–0 away win over Cambridge, Fletcher giving York the lead on 43 minutes after collecting a loose ball on the edge of the penalty area and scoring with a powerful shot. Coulson scored soon after the second half began when his deep cross dropped into the far corner of the goal, and Hyde finished the scoring in the 55th minute when diverting Fletcher's shot from inside the six-yard box. York went behind away to AFC Wimbledon when Deji Oshilaja scored a header in the 19th minute, before Hyde scored an equaliser after goalkeeper Joe McDonnell dropped Sinclair's cross in the 43rd minute. However, Jack Smith scored the winning goal for the home team with a volley in the 90th minute, meaning the match ended in a 2–1 win for AFC Wimbledon. Shaq Coulthirst, who scored Southend's winning goal against York in January, joined on loan from Tottenham Hotspur for the rest of the season, after Fletcher was ruled out for six weeks with a hamstring injury. York drew 0–0 at home to relegation rivals Carlisle, and the team's best chances came in the 74th minute when Coulson and Sinclair had shots cleared off the line. Having made nine appearances for York, Benning was recalled by Walsall due to an injury to Andy Taylor. Tom Soares scored early as York were beaten 1–0 at home by Bury, resulting in the team only being above the relegation zone on goal difference.

De Girolamo left York to join League Two rivals Northampton on loan for the rest of the season, explaining that "Northampton play attractive football and express myself by getting on the ball a lot". Winfield was recalled from his loan at AFC Wimbledon, having made seven appearances for them, after Zubar injured his thigh during the Bury match. Richard Cresswell was appointed as Wilcox's first-team coach, having previously held a consultancy role at the club since April 2014. York were held to a 2–2 draw away to Accrington; after Summerfield gave York the lead with a deflected 20-yard shot in the 63rd minute, Sean Maguire equalised after pouncing on a loose ball six minutes later. In the 76th minute Hyde put York back in the lead with a close-range finish before Josh Windass scored for Accrington with a 20-yard free kick in the 90th minute. This result meant York were one point above the relegation zone, but just two points from the bottom of the table. Ahead of the transfer deadline for loan signings, York signed two strikers on loan for the rest of the season; Shaun Miller from Coventry City and Josh O'Hanlon from Bournemouth. York moved three points above the relegation zone after beating Mansfield 4–1 away, Lowe opening the scoring with a header before Coulthirst scored with a low finish. Despite Olejnik being off sent off later in the first half for handling outside the penalty area, Hyde scored with a header shortly after half-time. Matt Rhead pulled one back for Mansfield before Coulthirst finished the scoring in the 89th minute.

=== April and May ===
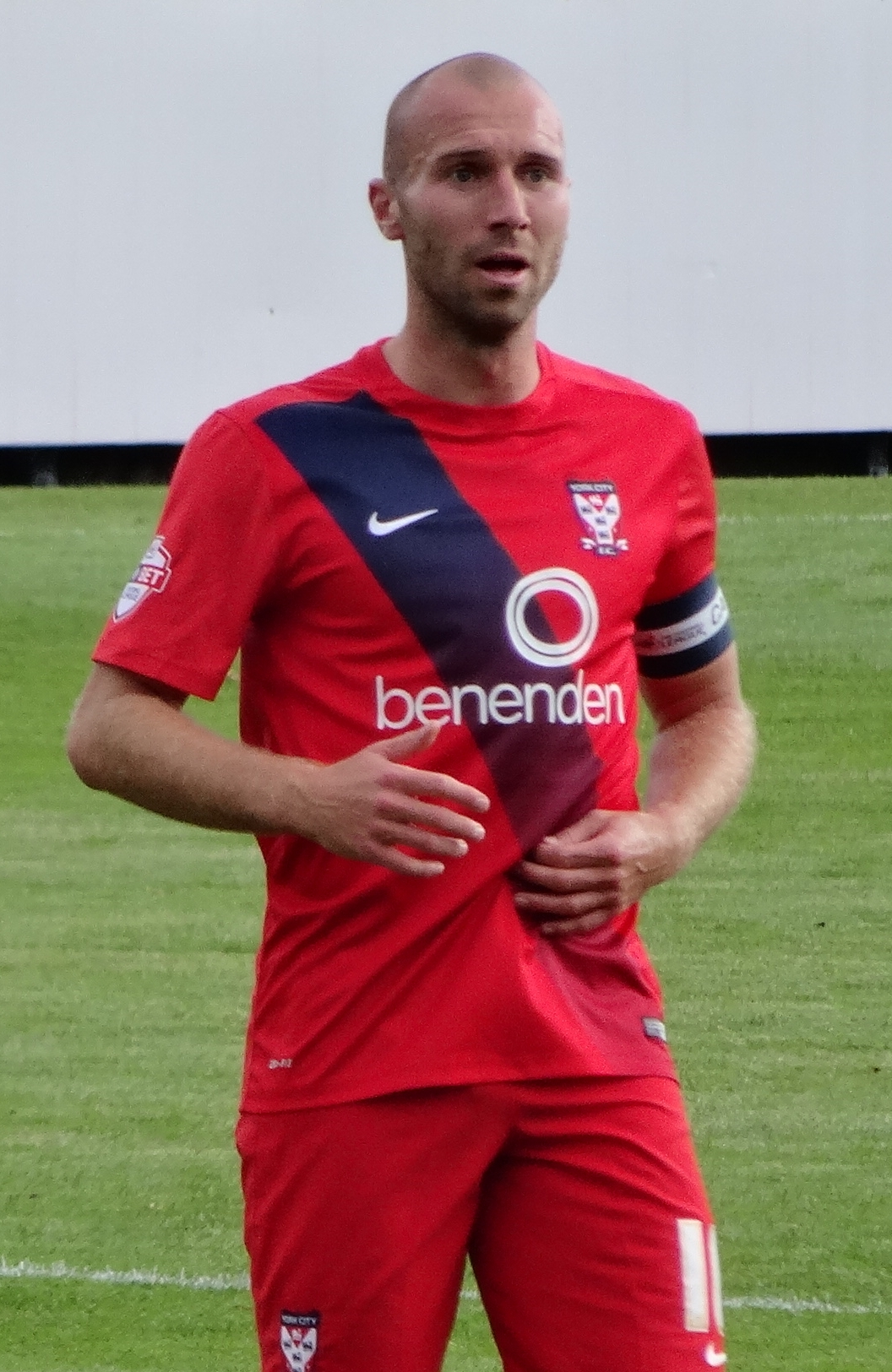
Russell Penn scored the winning goal in York's 2–1 home win over Morecambe, a result that secured the team's survival from relegation.

Mooney was recalled from his loan at Alfreton as a result of the one-match suspension Olejnik received for his red card. Winfield scored a 73rd-minute header from a Summerfield corner as York beat their relegation rivals Cheltenham 1–0 at home. York moved six points of the relegation zone after drawing 0–0 away to Oxford. Winfield was sent off in the first half of York's 1–0 home win over relegation-threatened Hartlepool, Summerfield scoring the winning goal during the second half with a deflected 30-yard shot. York ensured their safety from relegation after beating Morecambe 2–1 at home, moving 11 points clear of the relegation zone in 18th-place. Morecambe took the lead through Paul Mullin before Zubar converted Summerfield's corner with a far post header, and Penn scored the winning goal with a long-range strike into the top left-hand corner.

York were beaten for the first time in seven matches after losing 1–0 away to promotion contenders Shrewsbury, with Mark Ellis scoring their goal in the first half. York's final home match of the season ended in a 2–0 defeat to play-off chasing Newport, who scored twice in the second half with goals scored by David Tutonda and Lee Minshull, and Hyde had a penalty saved in between the goals. They finished the season after drawing 1–1 away to Portsmouth; Halliday equalised in the 85th minute after capitalising on a slip from Dan Butler, three minutes after Matt Tubbs had given the home team the lead. York's final league position in League Two was 18th, their lowest placing since promotion into that division three years ago. At an awards night held at York Racecourse, Lowe was voted by the club's supporters as the Clubman of the Year for 2014–15.

== Summary and aftermath ==
York were in lower midtable for most of the season, and rose as high as 11th in the table during September 2014 and dropped to 23rd during October and February 2015. The team had the second lowest number of victories in the League Two season with 11; only the two relegated teams, Cheltenham and Tranmere, recorded fewer wins with nine each. For the fourth time in nine seasons, York achieved a better record away than at home in the league. The team won six matches, drew nine and lost eight away, compared to winning five, drawing 10 and losing eight at home. Lowe made the highest number of appearances during the season, appearing in 49 of York's 50 matches. Hyde was York's top scorer in the league and in all competitions, with nine league goals and 10 in total. He was the only player to reach double figures, and was followed by Fletcher with seven goals.

At the season's end York released Fletcher, Jarvis, Lewis Montrose and Parslow. Carson, Ingham and Platt signed new contracts with the club. Over the close season York signed goalkeeper Scott Flinders from Hartlepool, defenders Taron Hare and Eddie Nolan from Scunthorpe, George Swan from Wolverhampton Wanderers, David Tutonda on loan from Cardiff City and Zubar on loan from Bournemouth, midfielder James Berrett from Yeovil Town, and strikers Vadaine Oliver from Crewe Alexandra and Reece Thompson from Frickley. Midfielder Callum Rzonca was promoted to the first-team squad from the youth team after signing a professional contract with the club.

== Match details ==
League positions are sourced by Statto, while the remaining information is referenced individually.

=== League Two ===
League Two match details
Date	League position	Opponents	Venue	Result	Score F–A	Scorers	Attendance	Ref.
9 August 2014	12th	Tranmere Rovers	A	D	1–1	Lowe 67'	6,287	
16 August 2014	16th	Northampton Town	H	D	1–1	Hyde 67'	3,448	
19 August 2014	17th	Cambridge United	H	D	2–2	Hyde 43', Fletcher 83' pen.	3,176	
23 August 2014	16th	Exeter City	A	D	1–1	Lowe 82'	2,741	
30 August 2014	17th	Wycombe Wanderers	H	D	0–0		3,209	
6 September 2014	11th	Stevenage	A	W	3–2	Coulson 3', Fletcher (2) 15', 75' pen.	3,090	
13 September 2014	16th	Burton Albion	A	L	0–2		2,890	
16 September 2014	16th	Luton Town	H	D	0–0		3,649	
20 September 2014	19th	Southend United	H	L	2–3	Penn 45+3', Winfield 85'	3,307	
27 September 2014	21st	Dagenham & Redbridge	A	L	0–2		1,801	
4 October 2014	21st	Portsmouth	H	D	0–0		3,857	
11 October 2014	22nd	Newport County	A	L	1–3	De Girolamo 7'	2,822	
18 October 2014	23rd	Shrewsbury Town	H	L	0–1		3,651	
21 October 2014	22nd	Morecambe	A	D	1–1	Coulson 77'	1,346	
25 October 2014	22nd	Mansfield Town	H	D	1–1	De Girolamo 20'	3,370	
1 November 2014	20th	Cheltenham Town	A	W	1–0	De Girolamo 43'	2,469	
15 November 2014	21st	Oxford United	H	L	0–1		3,363	
22 November 2014	20th	Hartlepool United	A	W	3–1	Lowe (2) 53', 55', Hyde 63'	4,234	
29 November 2014	21st	Plymouth Argyle	A	D	1–1	Hyde 90+4'	6,808	
13 December 2014	21st	AFC Wimbledon	H	L	2–3	De Girolamo 55', Zubar 75'	3,245	
20 December 2014	22nd	Bury	A	D	2–2	Hyde 66', Summerfield 78'	3,313	
26 December 2014	21st	Accrington Stanley	H	W	1–0	Lowe 35'	3,873	
28 December 2014	18th	Carlisle United	A	W	3–0	Carson 44', Summerfield 68', Coulson 81'	5,716	
3 January 2015	18th	Plymouth Argyle	H	D	0–0		3,869	
10 January 2015	19th	Wycombe Wanderers	A	L	0–1		3,669	
17 January 2015	19th	Stevenage	H	L	0–2		3,107	
24 January 2015	19th	Burton Albion	H	D	1–1	Sinclair 70'	3,398	
31 January 2015	22nd	Southend United	A	L	0–1		6,126	
7 February 2015	23rd	Dagenham & Redbridge	H	L	0–2		2,958	
10 February 2015	23rd	Luton Town	A	D	2–2	Carson 55', Sinclair 59'	7,763	
14 February 2015	20th	Tranmere Rovers	H	W	2–0	Fletcher 20', 58'	3,714	
21 February 2015	22nd	Northampton Town	A	L	0–3		4,694	
28 February 2015	22nd	Exeter City	H	D	0–0		3,209	
3 March 2015	20th	Cambridge United	A	W	3–0	Fletcher 43', Coulson 49', Hyde 55'	4,037	
7 March 2015	20th	AFC Wimbledon	A	L	1–2	Hyde 43'	4,086	
14 March 2015	20th	Carlisle United	H	D	0–0		4,274	
17 March 2015	21st	Bury	H	L	0–1		3,194	
21 March 2015	21st	Accrington Stanley	A	D	2–2	Summerfield 63', Hyde 76'	1,454	
28 March 2015	20th	Mansfield Town	A	W	4–1	Lowe 9', Coulthirst (2) 17', 89', Hyde 52'	3,133	
3 April 2015	20th	Cheltenham Town	H	W	1–0	Winfield 73'	4,151	
6 April 2015	19th	Oxford United	A	D	0–0		9,406	
11 April 2015	19th	Hartlepool United	H	W	1–0	Summerfield 67'	5,424	
14 April 2015	18th	Morecambe	H	W	2–1	Zubar 34', Penn 51'	2,854	
18 April 2015	19th	Shrewsbury Town	A	L	0–1		6,400	
25 April 2015	19th	Newport County	H	L	0–2		3,459	
2 May 2015	18th	Portsmouth	A	D	1–1	Halliday 85'	17,254	

=== League table (part) ===
Final League Two table (part)
Pos	Club	Pld	W	D	L	F	A	GD	Pts
16th	Portsmouth	46	14	15	17	52	54	−2	57
17th	Accrington Stanley	46	15	11	20	58	77	−19	56
18th	York City	46	11	19	16	46	51	−5	52
19th	Cambridge United	46	13	12	21	61	66	−5	51
20th	Carlisle United	46	14	8	24	56	74	−18	50
Key	Pos = League position; Pld = Matches played; W = Matches won; D = Matches drawn; L = Matches lost; F = Goals for; A = Goals against; GD = Goal difference; Pts = Points								
Source									

=== FA Cup ===
FA Cup match details
Round	Date	Opponents	Venue	Result	Score F–A	Scorers	Attendance	Ref.
First round	8 November 2014	AFC Wimbledon	H	D	1–1	Hyde 8'	2,085	
First round replay	18 November 2014	AFC Wimbledon	A	L	1–3	Fletcher 5'	2,048	

=== League Cup ===
League Cup match details
Round	Date	Opponents	Venue	Result	Score F–A	Scorers	Attendance	Ref.
First round	12 August 2014	Doncaster Rovers	H	L	0–1		3,357	

=== Football League Trophy ===
Football League Trophy match details
Round	Date	Opponents	Venue	Result	Score F–A	Scorers	Attendance	Ref.
First round	2 September 2014	Barnsley	A	L	0–2		4,218	

== Transfers ==
=== In ===
Date	Player	Club†	Fee	Ref.
22 May 2014	Femi Ilesanmi	(Dagenham & Redbridge)	Free	
29 May 2014	Jason Mooney	(Tranmere Rovers)	Free	
2 June 2014	Jake Hyde	(Barnet)	Compensation	
9 June 2014	Marvin McCoy	(Wycombe Wanderers)	Free	
12 June 2014	Anthony Straker	(Southend United)	Free	
16 June 2014	Dave Winfield	(Shrewsbury Town)	Free	
30 June 2014	Luke Summerfield	(Shrewsbury Town)	Free	
1 July 2014	Lindon Meikle	(Mansfield Town)	Free	
20 January 2015	Emile Sinclair	(Northampton Town)	Free	

† Brackets around club names denote the player's contract with that club had expired before he joined York.

=== Out ===
Date	Player	Club†	Fee	Ref.
3 July 2014	Ryan Bowman	Torquay United	Free	
5 February 2015	Cameron Murray	(Scarborough Athletic)	Released	
7 May 2015	Wes Fletcher	(Motherwell)	Released	
7 May 2015	Ryan Jarvis	(Lowestoft Town)	Released	
7 May 2015	Lewis Montrose	(Stockport County)	Released	
21 May 2015	Daniel Parslow	(Cheltenham Town)	Released	

† Brackets around club names denote the player joined that club after his York contract expired.

=== Loan in ===
Date	Player	Club	Return	Ref.
30 September 2014	Ryan Brunt	Bristol Rovers	1 November 2014	
9 October 2014	Diego De Girolamo	Sheffield United	Recalled 4 November 2014	
24 October 2014	Alex Cisak	Burnley	4 January 2015	
30 October 2014	Deon Burton	Scunthorpe United	Recalled 12 November 2014	
7 November 2014	Stéphane Zubar	AFC Bournemouth	End of season	
14 November 2014	Brad Halliday	Middlesbrough	End of season	
26 November 2014	Diego De Girolamo	Sheffield United	4 January 2015	
27 November 2014	Carlton Morris	Norwich City	9 February 2015	
5 January 2015	Bobby Olejnik	Peterborough United	End of season	
22 January 2015	Mal Benning	Walsall	Recalled 16 March 2015	
17 February 2015	Diego De Girolamo	Sheffield United	Recalled 19 March 2015	
13 March 2015	Shaq Coulthirst	Tottenham Hotspur	End of season	
26 March 2015	Shaun Miller	Coventry City	End of season	
26 March 2015	Josh O'Hanlon	AFC Bournemouth	End of season	

=== Loan out ===
Date	Player	Club	Return	Ref.
18 September 2014	Daniel Parslow	Grimsby Town	20 October 2014	
7 November 2014	Daniel Parslow	Grimsby Town	End of season	
19 December 2014	Cameron Murray	Frickley Athletic	20 January 2015	
13 January 2015	Ryan Jarvis	Aldershot Town	End of season	
17 January 2015	Jason Mooney	Alfreton Town	Recalled 3 April 2015	
29 January 2015	Anthony Straker	Motherwell	End of season	
12 February 2015	Dave Winfield	AFC Wimbledon	Recalled 19 March 2015	

== Appearances and goals ==
Numbers in parentheses denote appearances as substitute.
Players with names struck through and marked † left the club during the playing season.
Players with names in italics and marked * were on loan from another club for the whole of their season with York.
Players listed with no appearances have been in the matchday squad but only as unused substitutes.
Key to positions: GK – Goalkeeper; DF – Defender; MF – Midfielder; FW – Forward

Players included in matchday squads
No.	Pos.	Nat.	Name	League		FA Cup		League Cup		FL Trophy		Total		Discipline	
No.	Pos.	Nat.	Name	Apps	Goals	Apps	Goals	Apps	Goals	Apps	Goals	Apps	Goals	A yellow rectangle, denoting the yellow penalty card shown to a player being cautioned	A red rectangle, denoting the red penalty card shown to a player being sent off
1	GK	NIR	Jason Mooney	3 (1)	0	0	0	1	0	0	0	4 (1)	0	0	0
2	DF	ATG	Marvin McCoy	30 (1)	0	2	0	1	0	1	0	34 (1)	0	5	0
3	DF	ENG	Femi Ilesanmi	29 (4)	0	2	0	1	0	1	0	33 (4)	0	2	0
5	DF	ENG	John McCombe	27 (4)	0	1	0	1	0	1	0	30 (4)	0	4	0
6	DF	WAL	Daniel Parslow	0	0	0	0	0	0	0	0	0	0	0	0
7	MF	ENG	Michael Coulson	43	4	2	0	1	0	1	0	47	4	3	0
8	MF	ENG	Luke Summerfield	26 (5)	4	0 (1)	0	0	0	1	0	27 (6)	4	2	0
9	FW	ENG	Wes Fletcher	22 (7)	6	1 (1)	1	0	0	1	0	24 (8)	7	2	0
10	MF	ENG	Russell Penn	45	2	2	0	1	0	1	0	49	2	8	1
11	FW	ENG	Ryan Jarvis	5 (3)	0	0	0	1	0	0	0	6 (3)	0	0	1
12	MF	NIR	Josh Carson	18 (4)	2	0 (1)	0	0	0	0	0	18 (5)	2	4	0
13	MF	GRN	Anthony Straker	7 (5)	0	0	0	1	0	1	0	9 (5)	0	1	0
14	MF	ENG	Lewis Montrose	10 (4)	0	2	0	0	0	0 (1)	0	12 (5)	0	2	0
15	DF	ENG	Keith Lowe	46	6	2	0	0	0	1	0	49	6	1	0
16	DF	ENG	Dave Winfield	9 (1)	2	0	0	1	0	0	0	10 (1)	2	1	1
17	DF	ENG	Brad Halliday *	24	1	0	0	0	0	0	0	24	1	5	1
18	MF	ENG	Tom Platt	7 (13)	0	0 (1)	0	1	0	0	0	8 (14)	0	1	0
19	FW	ITA	~~Diego De Girolamo~~ * †	9 (3)	4	0	0	0	0	0	0	9 (3)	4	0	0
19	FW	ENG	Shaun Miller *	2 (4)	0	0	0	0	0	0	0	2 (4)	0	0	0
20	MF	ENG	Lindon Meikle	13 (15)	0	2	0	1	0	1	0	17 (15)	0	0	0
21	FW	ENG	Ben Hirst	0 (3)	0	0	0	0 (1)	0	0 (1)	0	0 (5)	0	0	0
22	MF	ENG	Ben Godfrey	0	0	0	0	0	0	0	0	0	0	0	0
23	MF	ENG	~~Cameron Murray~~ †	0	0	0	0	0	0	0	0	0	0	0	0
23	FW	IRL	Josh O'Hanlon *	0 (3)	0	0	0	0	0	0	0	0 (3)	0	0	0
24	GK	NIR	Michael Ingham	17 (2)	0	2	0	0	0	1	0	20 (2)	0	0	0
25	FW	ENG	~~Carlton Morris~~ * †	0 (8)	0	0	0	0	0	0	0	0 (8)	0	1	0
26	FW	ENG	~~Ryan Brunt~~ * †	5 (1)	0	0	0	0	0	0	0	5 (1)	0	0	0
28	FW	JAM	~~Deon Burton~~ * †	1	0	1	0	0	0	0	0	2	0	0	0
28	DF	ENG	~~Mal Benning~~ * †	9	0	0	0	0	0	0	0	9	0	2	0
29	GK	AUS	~~Alex Cisak~~ * †	10	0	0	0	0	0	0	0	10	0	0	0
29	FW	ENG	Emile Sinclair	9 (3)	2	0	0	0	0	0	0	9 (3)	2	0	0
30	FW	ENG	Shaq Coulthirst *	10 (1)	2	0	0	0	0	0	0	10 (1)	2	0	0
31	GK	AUT	Bobby Olejnik *	16	0	0	0	0	0	0	0	16	0	1	1
38	DF	GPE	Stéphane Zubar *	22 (1)	2	1 (1)	0	0	0	0	0	23 (2)	2	1	1
39	FW	ENG	Jake Hyde	32 (7)	9	2	1	0	0	0 (1)	0	34 (8)	10	3	1

== See also ==
- List of York City F.C. seasons
