= Brighouse High School =

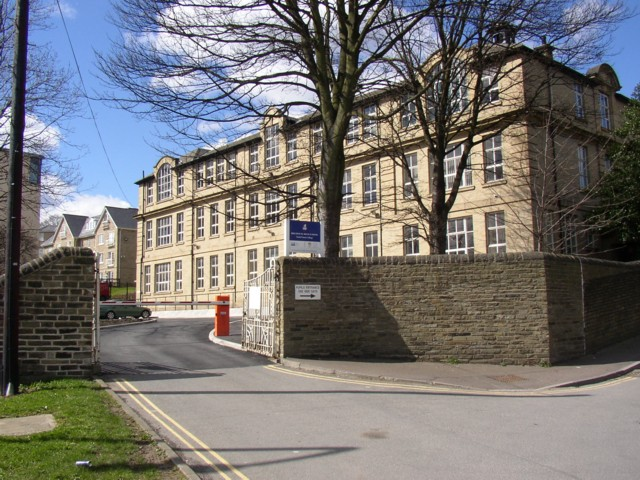

Location
- Finkil Street; Brighouse, West Yorkshire, HD6 2NY; England; 53°42′48″N 1°47′47″W

Information
- Type: Academy
- Established: 1910
- Local authority: Calderdale
- Specialist: Business & Enterprise; Leading Edge; Applied Learning
- Department for Education URN: 136604 Tables
- Ofsted: Reports
- Head Teacher: Richard Horsfield
- Staff: 70 (approx)
- Gender: Mixed-sex education
- Age: 11 to 18
- Enrolment: 1,316
- Houses: Jupiter (BR), Mercury (IG), Pluto (HU), Saturn (SE)
- Colours: Navy, Burgundy
- Website: http://www.brighouse.calderdale.sch.uk/

Brighouse High School (and Sixth Form) is an academy school in Brighouse, West Yorkshire, England.

== Admissions ==
It has approximately 1,400 students. The school contains around 1,050 students while the Sixth form contains around 350 students. The school is a Business and Enterprise College, rated 'good' by Ofsted. Brighouse High School's Headteacher is Richard Horsfield. It is adjacent to Halifax Road (A644) in the Hove Edge area of north-west Brighouse.

== History ==
The school began as Brighouse & District Girls' Secondary School on 6 September 1910 then became "Brighouse Girls' Grammar School" in 1944. In 1985, following reorganisation of education in Calderdale, it became Brighouse High School, a mixed comprehensive school.

It is now a comprehensive school with Academy status and educates students aged 11–18 years old.

The sixth form is separate from the main school in the former grammar school in the town centre on Halifax Road and recently the new Mulberry Suite has opened, which includes a cafeteria for students and new study rooms.

== Academic performance ==
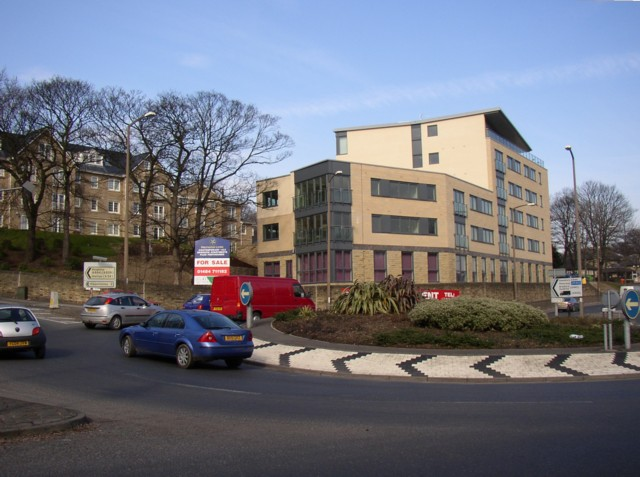
Sixth form centre (to the right)

== Notable alumni ==
Notable former students of Brighouse High School have included actor Matthew Wolfenden, politician Holly Lynch, footballer Cameron Murray, and comedian Jack Carroll.
