= Dean Bouzanis =

Australian soccer player (born 1990)

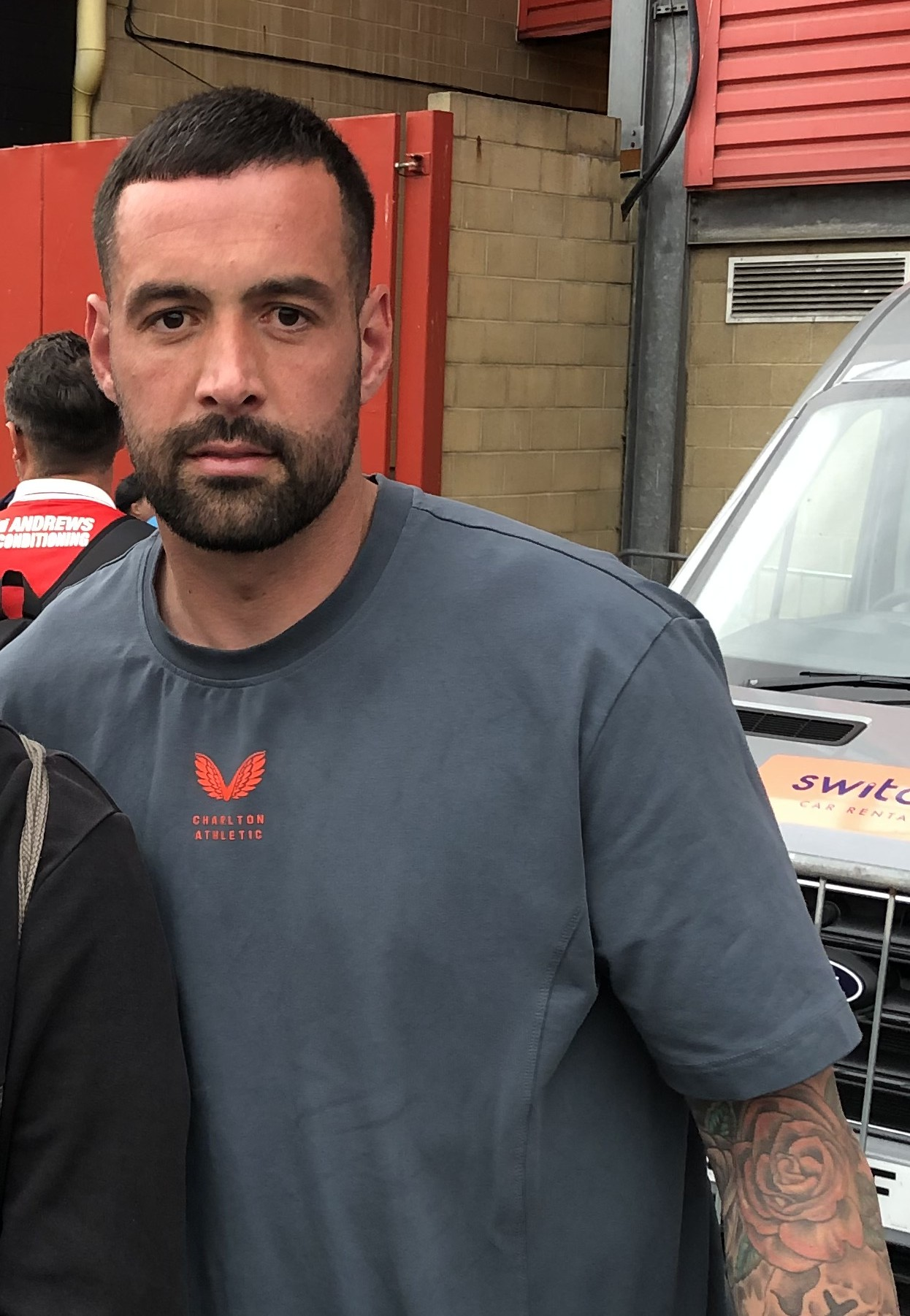
- Bouzanis in 2025.

Personal information
- Full name: Dean Anthony Bouzanis
- Date of birth: 2 October 1990 (age 36)
- Place of birth: Sydney, New South Wales, Australia
- Height: 1.89 m (6 ft 2 in)
- Position: Goalkeeper

Team information
- Current team: Brisbane Roar
- Number: 1

Youth career
- Lilli Pilli FC
- Carss Park
- Sutherland Sharks
- Northern Spirit
- Sydney Olympic
- 2006–2007: NSWIS
- 2007–2009: Liverpool

Senior career*
Years	Team	Apps	(Gls)
2007–2011	Liverpool	0	(0)
2007	→ Sydney FC (loan)	0	(0)
2009–2010	→ Accrington Stanley (loan)	14	(0)
2011–2013	Oldham Athletic	45	(0)
2013	Aris	1	(0)
2013–2014	Carlisle United	0	(0)
2014–2016	Western Sydney Wanderers	6	(0)
2016–2020	Melbourne City	57	(0)
2018–2019	→ PEC Zwolle (loan)	0	(0)
2020–2022	Sutton United	86	(0)
2022–2025	Reading	6	(0)
2023–2024	→ Sutton United (loan)	25	(0)
2024–2025	→ Stevenage (loan)	0	(0)
2025	Charlton Athletic	0	(0)
2025–	Brisbane Roar	26	(0)

International career^{‡}
2005–2006	Australia U17	8	(0)
2008	Greece U19	3	(0)
2009	Australia U20	3	(0)
2008–2011	Australia U23	3	(0)
- * Club domestic league appearances and goals as of 17:10, 25 April 2026 (UTC) ‡ National team caps and goals as of 23:59, 31 December 2025 (UTC)

Dean Anthony Bouzanis (born 2 October 1990) is an Australian professional soccer player who plays as a goalkeeper for Brisbane Roar.

He played junior football in Australia before joining English side Liverpool, appearing for the academy between 2007 and 2009, and also for the reserves side. After a loan move to Accrington Stanley he joined Oldham Athletic, before brief stays at Aris and Carlisle United. In 2014, he returned to Australia to play for the Wanderers in the A-League.

He has been capped by both Australia and Greece at youth international level.

== Club career ==
=== Early career ===
Bouzanis was born in Sydney, New South Wales, Australia to Greek parents, and attended De La Salle College in Cronulla, New South Wales. His talents were first seen at his local soccer club, Lilli Pilli FC, whilst playing in the Under 6's, before moving to Carrs Park FC, alongside close friend Nikolas Tsattalios. Bouzanis then went on to play in the NSW State League for St George Saints at 14 before joining the NSW Institute of Sport.

=== Liverpool ===
Bouzanis spent three weeks with the Liverpool first team squad in January 2007 and was offered a three-year deal. Liverpool's manager Rafael Benítez, stated that he rated the Australian as "the best goalkeeper in the world for his age".

==== Loan to Sydney ====
He was loaned to A-League side Sydney FC as understudy to Clint Bolton and was included in the club's squad for their AFC Champions League 2007 campaign, but did not appear at the tournament, and was subsequently delisted.

==== 2007–08 season ====
In July 2007, Bouzanis returned to Liverpool from his loan. He appeared for Liverpool's under 18 Academy and reserve teams. He appeared in successive games for Liverpool's Academy in September, October and November 2007. On 4 December 2007, Bouzanis appeared for Liverpool's reserve team. He made consecutive appearances for the reserves from January to April 2008. On 4 March 2008, however, Bouzanis was an unused substitute in a reserves game against Bolton Wanderers. On 7 May 2008, Bouzanis made his last reserves appearance for the 2007–08 season.

==== 2008–09 season ====
On 27 September 2008, Bouzanis appeared for Liverpool's Academy. In September 2008, he was named in the reserve team for a fixture against Sunderland in which Jermaine Pennant was named. On 18 October 2008, Bouzanis again appeared for the academy. On 3 November 2008, Bouzanis was an unused substitute in Liverpool's reserves squad that were defeated 2–1 against Manchester City. On 24 November 2008, Bouzanis played for the reserves. On 16 December 2008, he made his last appearance for the year in a reserves game. On 29 January 2009, Bouzanis played for the reserves. On 27 February 2009, he played in a game for the academy. On 4 March 2009, Bouzanis kept for the reserves in a 2–0 defeat against American club Columbus Crew. In March and April, Bouzanis appeared for the reserves. On 26 May 2009, Bouzanis made his last appearance for the 2008–09 season, appearing for the academy.

==== 2009–10 season ====
In September 2009, Bouzanis didn't amass any appearances for Liverpool due to international duty at the FIFA U-20 World Cup in Egypt. After a loan deal with Conference National team Wrexham fell through in July 2009, he joined Football League Two club Accrington Stanley on loan in November, subsequently making 14 league appearances for the club.

==== Loan to Accrington Stanley ====
On 29 October 2009, he appeared for the Accrington Stanley reserves. On 28 December 2009, Bouzanis started in a game for Accrington Stanley's first-team. On 30 January 2010, Bouzanis appeared for the first-team. In February, March and May, Bouzanis was an unused substitute for the first-team. In May 2010, Bouzanis returned to Liverpool from his loan at Accrington Stanley.

==== 2010–11 season ====
On 27 September 2010, Bouzanis appeared for Liverpool's reserves. He made successive appearances for the reserves in October and November, making his last appearance of the year on 16 November. In January, February and March 2011, Bouzanis made appearances for Liverpool's reserves. In April 2011, Bouzanis was released by Liverpool. He departed the club after mutually agreeing to a release with one year remaining on his contract.

=== Oldham Athletic ===
In July 2011, Bouzanis claimed he had agreed terms with A-league club Melbourne Victory but this was denied by the club.

On 26 November 2011, Bouzanis joined EFL League One side Oldham Athletic on non-contract terms as cover for injured back-up keeper Paul Gerrard following a four-week trial. His time at the club included an FA Cup tie against former club Liverpool at Anfield, although Bouzanis spent the match on the bench as an unused substitute. The following month, Bouzanis signed a new deal with the club, until the end of the season.

He made his competitive Latics debut on 27 March 2012 coming on as second-half substitute against Leyton Orient. After a spell in the side at the end of the 2011–12 season when Oldham's first choice keeper Alex Cisak was injured. At the end of the 2011–12 season, Bouzanis signed a new one-year contract following his good display for his performance.

At the start of the 2012–13 season, Bouzanis suffered an ankle injury during the pre-season friendly. He dropped again to the bench at the beginning of the 2012–13 season, before regaining his first-team spot in September. On 27 January 2013, Bouzanis played in Oldham's upset 3–2 win in a F.A. Cup club 4th round tie against Liverpool. Bouzanis was subsequently released by Oldham at the end of the 2012–13 season.

=== Aris ===
Following his departure from Oldham Athletic, Bouzanis joined Greek side Aris, but failed to make a senior appearance.

=== Carlisle United ===
Bouzanis was released by Aris in December 2013, and joined Carlisle United on a free transfer on 28 January 2014, on a short-term deal until April, but made no appearances.

=== Western Sydney Wanderers ===
In May 2014, Bouzanis returned to his home town, signing with Western Sydney Wanderers.

=== Melbourne City (2016–2018) ===
Bouzanis replaced Tando Velaphi at Melbourne City during the January transfer window of the 2015-16 A-League. He signed a one-year contract extension on 28 April 2016, with his new deal to end at the end of the 2016-17 A-League season. Bouzanis made his competitive City debut on 8 October 2016 in the club's first game of the 2016–17 A-League, coming on in the second half after Thomas Sørensen was sent off in a 1–0 win. On 8 February 2017, Bouzanis was banned for five games for using a racial slur against Melbourne Victory, Besart Berisha after appearing to call the Albanian striker a "gypsy".

In July 2020, Bouzanis left Melbourne City.

==== PEC Zwolle (loan) ====
On 31 August 2018, he joined Eredivisie club PEC Zwolle on a season-long loan with an option to buy.

=== Sutton United ===
In August 2020, Bouzanis signed with National League side Sutton United, moving to London with partner Steph Catley, who signed with Arsenal. He kept 18 clean sheets across the season as Sutton won the National League and promotion to the English Football League for the first time in the club's 123-year history.

=== Reading ===
On 27 June 2022, Bouzanis joined Championship club Reading on a three-year contract to provide competition with fellow new signing Joe Lumley for the first-choice goalkeeper spot.

On 3 February 2025, Reading announced that Bouzanis had left the club after his contract was ended by mutual agreement.

==== Sutton United (loan) ====
On 1 September 2023 Bouzanis rejoined Sutton United on loan until January 2024. On 23 January 2024, Reading announced that Bouzanis' loan had been extended to the end of the season.

==== Stevenage (loan) ====
On 12 August 2024 Bouzanis joined Stevenage on loan until January 2025.

=== Charlton Athletic ===
On 22 March 2025, Bouzanis joined Charlton Athletic on a short-term deal.

On 30 May 2025, it was confirmed Bouzanis would leave the club following the conclusion of his contract.

=== Brisbane Roar ===
On 7 July 2025, Bouzanis joined Brisbane Roar.

== International career ==
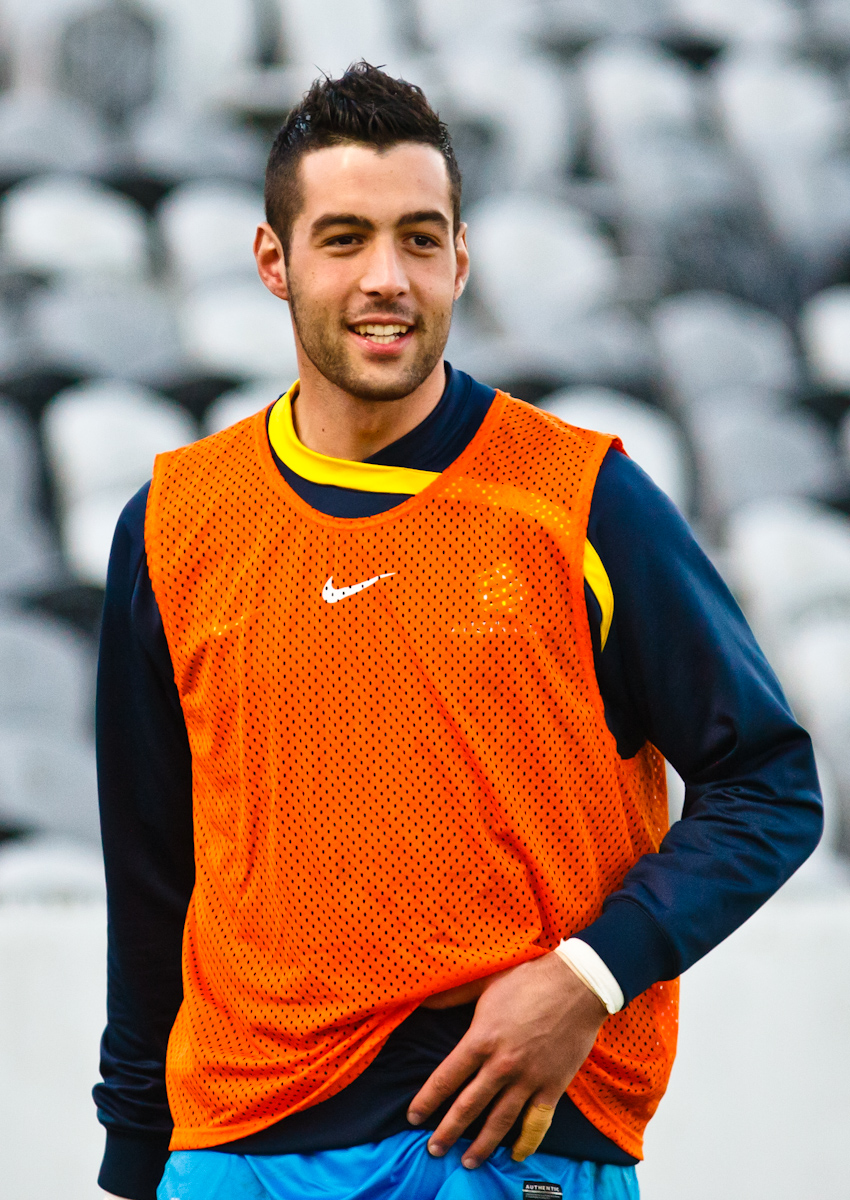
Bouzanis with Australia U23 in 2011.

Bouzanis was first named in the Australian U17 side in 2005 at the age of 15. He was also later included in the squad for Australia's unsuccessful 2006 AFC U17 Championships qualifying campaign.

On 2 February 2008, Bouzanis was invited by the Greek FA manager Alexis Alexiou to represent the youth team against Slovakia on 5 February 2008. Bouzanis visited Greece on 3 February 2008 for an interview with Greek radio station SportFM, and also to play in the friendly against Slovakia, in which he kept a clean sheet. He also played in a 1–0 win against Serbia in March 2008.

Despite playing for the Greek U19 team Bouzanis remained eligible to play for either the Greek or Australian full international sides. The Australian press stated that his departure would be a "disaster" likening it to the loss of Joey Didulica to the Croatian national side.

In April 2008 he was called up to the Australia Under 23 squad to compete in the Intercontinental Cup in Malaysia as part of their preparations for the Olympics due to Danny Vukovic's suspension. He played in the 4–0 defeat of Togo in the final group match. With the announcement that Vukovic's suspension would not be lifted for the Olympics, suggestions were made that Bouzanis would be included in the squad but this did not eventuate. In the same month, Australian national coach Pim Verbeek met Bouzanis in Liverpool to discuss his football allegiance.

In June 2008, Bouzanis accepted an invitation to represent Greece in the UEFA U-19 European Championships. and stated he was proud to be competing at the finals with Greece. Bouzanis' decision to play for the Greek under-age team upset some of Australia's football community. Bouzanis' agent suggested he still wanted to play for Australia.

In July 2008, Bouzanis was listed in a group of Australian footballers aged between 16 and 22 known as "the lost boys", including Paul Giannou, Andreas Govas and Robert Stambolziev, who were likely to play for or had played for national teams of the country of their heritage.

In February 2009, his agent stated that Bouzanis wanted to play for Australia rather than Greece. Bouzanis subsequently appeared in Australia's first two group matches at the 2009 FIFA U-20 World Cup in Egypt. Bouzanis' next international appearance was as a half-time substitute in an Under-23 friendly on 1 June 2011 against Japan. He was subsequently named in the squad for the Olyroos London Olympics 2012 qualifying matches against Yemen in June 2011.

== Personal life ==
Bouzanis was in a long-term relationship with women's soccer player Steph Catley. On 31 January 2023, the couple announced that they were engaged. They split in 2024.

Bouzanis is a fan of Premier League club Liverpool.

== Career statistics ==
As of match played 25 April 2026

Appearances and goals by club, season and competition
Club	Season	League			National Cup		League Cup		Continental		Other		Total	
Club	Season	Division	Apps	Goals	Apps	Goals	Apps	Goals	Apps	Goals	Apps	Goals	Apps	Goals
Liverpool	2006–07	Premier League	0	0	0	0	0	0	0	0	0	0	0	0
Liverpool	2007–08	Premier League	0	0	0	0	0	0	0	0	0	0	0	0
Liverpool	2008–09	Premier League	0	0	0	0	0	0	0	0	0	0	0	0
Liverpool	2009–10	Premier League	0	0	0	0	0	0	0	0	0	0	0	0
Liverpool	2010–11	Premier League	0	0	0	0	0	0	0	0	0	0	0	0
Liverpool	Total		0	0	0	0	0	0	0	0	0	0	0	0
Sydney FC (loan)	2006–07	A-League	0	0	—		—		—		—		0	0
Accrington Stanley (loan)	2009–10	League Two	14	0	4	0	—		—		1	0	19	0
Oldham Athletic	2011–12	League One	9	0	0	0	0	0	—		0	0	9	0
Oldham Athletic	2012–13	League One	36	0	5	0	0	0	—		1	0	42	0
Oldham Athletic	Total		45	0	5	0	0	0	—		1	0	51	0
Aris	2013–14	Super League Greece	1	0	1	0	—		—		—		2	0
Carlisle United	2013–14	League One	0	0	—		—		—		—		0	0
Western Sydney Wanderers	2014–15	A-League	6	0	0	0	—		1	0	1	0	8	0
Western Sydney Wanderers	2015–16	A-League	0	0	0	0	—		—		—		0	0
Western Sydney Wanderers	Total		6	0	0	0	—		1	0	1	0	8	0
Melbourne City	2015–16	A-League	1	0	—		—		—		—		0	0
Melbourne City	2016–17	A-League	22	0	2	0	—		—		—		25	0
Melbourne City	2017–18	A-League	21	0	2	0	—		—		—		23	0
Melbourne City	2019–20	A-League	13	0	5	0	—		—		—		14	0
Melbourne City	Total		57	0	9	0	—		—		—		66	0
PEC Zwolle (loan)	2018–19	Eredivisie	0	0	0	0	—		—		—		0	0
Sutton United	2020–21	National League	42	0	1	0	0	0	—		3	0	46	0
Sutton United	2021–22	League Two	44	0	2	0	1	0	—		6	0	53	0
Sutton United	Total		86	0	3	0	1	0	—		9	0	99	0
Reading	2022–23	Championship	5	0	2	0	1	0	—		—		8	0
Reading	2023–24	League One	1	0	—		0	0	—		—		1	0
Reading	Total		6	0	2	0	1	0	—		—		9	0
Sutton United (loan)	2023–24	League Two	25	0	3	0	0	0	—		0	0	28	0
Stevenage (loan)	2024–25	League One	0	0	0	0	0	0	—		1	0	1	0
Charlton Athletic	2024–25	League One	0	0	—		—		—		—		0	0
Brisbane Roar	2025–26	A-League	26	0	0	0	—		—		—		26	0
Career total			266	0	27	0	2	0	1	0	13	0	309	0

== Honours ==
Western Sydney Wanderers

- AFC Champions League: 2014

Melbourne City

- FFA Cup: 2016

Sutton United

- National League: 2020–21
- EFL Trophy runner-up: 2021–22
