= Andreas Govas =

Australian soccer player (born 1989)

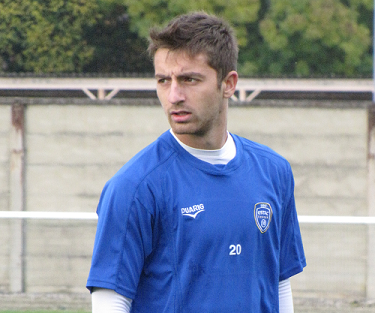
- Govas in 2012

Personal information
- Date of birth: 21 July 1989 (age 37)
- Place of birth: Melbourne, Australia
- Height: 1.82 m (6 ft 0 in)
- Position: Midfielder

Youth career
- Heidelberg United
- Fawkner Blues
- 2006: VIS
- 2007–2008: Portsmouth

Senior career*
Years	Team	Apps	(Gls)
2008	Portsmouth	0	(0)
2008	Apollon Kalamarias	7	(0)
2009	Kozani	4	(0)
2010–2011	Kavala	0	(0)
2010–2011	→ Kozani (loan)	27	(7)
2012	Troyes	0	(0)
2012–2013	AEL Kalloni	25	(1)
2014	Oakleigh Cannons	20	(1)
2015–2016	Heidelberg United	43	(7)
2016	Bulleen Lions	8	(1)
2017	Port Melbourne	26	(9)
2017–2018	Heidelberg United	4	(0)

International career
2008	Greece U19	2	(0)
2008	Australia U20	3	(0)
- * Club domestic league appearances and goals as of 24 September 2018

Andreas Govas (born 21 July 1989) is an Australian former soccer player who played as a midfielder.

== Club career ==
Govas trained at the Victorian Institute of Sport alongside Paul Giannou, Matthew Spiranovic, Adrian Leijer, Leigh Broxham, Milos Lujic, Dimitri Hatzimouratis and Matthew Theodore, where he was coached by Ernie Merrick. Following his apprenticeship at the Victorian Institute of Sport, Govas was invited for a one-day trial with the Australian Institute of Sport and was not ultimately not selected, however, this followed by earning a contract with Portsmouth's Academy and Reserves.

=== Portsmouth ===
Govas signed his first professional contract with Premier League outfit Portsmouth F.C. for the 2007–08 season, joining the club's Academy and Reserves teams under director Paul Hart. On 27 October 2007, he appeared in a game for the academy. On 12 November 2007, Govas appeared for the academy team in another game. On 17 December 2007, Govas made his last appearance of the year in a game for Portsmouth's Academy. On 23 January 2008, he was an unused substitute in a 1–0 home loss for Portsmouth's reserves against West Ham United. On 19 February 2008, he appeared again for the reserves. On 21 April 2008, Govas appeared for the academy team and made his last appearance for the club. In July 2008, he departed Portsmouth to join Greek club Apollon Kalamarias.

==== Greece ====
In July 2008, Govas transferred to Greek club Apollon Kalamarias. where he and Australian Apostolos Giannou played together in the Greek Football League, a year which saw Govas gain 7 appearances before transferring to FS Kozani.

In January 2010 Govas signed for Greek Super League Greece Club Kavala, where he joined fellow Australians; Zeljko Kalac, Apostolos Giannou, Craig Moore and Robert Stambolziev.

==== France ====
In January 2012, he signed a six-month contract with French Ligue 2 side Troyes AC who were promoted in the same season to Ligue 1.

==== Return to Greece ====
In September 2012, he signed a two-year contract with AEL Kalloni in the Greek Football League. He played an important role throughout the season helping Kalloni FC gain automatic promotion to the Greek Super League Greece for the first time in the club's history.

=== Return to Australia ===
In February 2014, Govas signed for National Premier League club Oakleigh Cannons FC under coach Miron Bleiberg. The Cannons finished league runners up in Govas' only season with the club. In November 2014, Govas signed for his childhood football club Heidelberg United in the National Premier League. Govas scored an incredible long-range goal in April 2015 as Heidelberg beat Green Gully by a scoreline of 8–2. On 15 June 2016 Govas left the Bergers mid-season for league counterparts FC Bulleen Lions. In 2017 Govas signed for National Premier League club Port Melbourne SC and was one of the best players throughout the 2017 season scoring numerous long bombs along the way. In round 2 he was in the NPL Victoria Team of the Week. In 2018 Govas signed for National Premier League club Heidelberg United.

== International career ==
In July 2008, Govas was listed in a group of Australian footballers aged between 16 and 22 known as "the lost boys", including Paul Giannou, Robert Stambolziev and Dean Bouzanis, who were likely to play for or had played for national teams of the country of their heritage.

He was a part of the Australia U-20 team that participated in and won the 2008 ASEAN Youth Championship.

He was also a part of the Australia U-20 team that competed at the AFC U-19 Championship 2008.

In 2008, he had also represented Greece's national U-19 squad with Apostolos Giannou and Dean Bouzanis. It had been reported that Govas, Giannou and Bouzanis chose to represent Greece as they had been snubbed by Australian national selectors.

"I represented the Victorian squad at Under 15 and Under 16 levels and I was lucky enough to have been selected for the VIS to be part of a development program aimed at producing players for the national team. As I came towards the end of my time at VIS I was hoping to get an international call-up or an invitation to the AIS. I was invited up to the AIS for a trial, but unfortunately I was not in the (selected) 18 and was sent home. I thought I was really good while on trial there and was surprised not to have been picked. I was also then told that I would not be in the mix for AIS selection, so I looked overseas." – Govas speaking with Melbourne's Greek newspaper Neos Kosmos

== Honours ==
Australia U19

- AFF U-19 Youth Championship: 2008
