= Georgios Machlelis =

German-born Greek footballer

Georgios Mahlelis
Personal information
- Full name: Georgios Mahlelis
- Date of birth: 10 May 1991 (age 35)
- Place of birth: Waiblingen, Germany
- Height: 1.83 m (6 ft 0 in)
- Positions: Defensive midfielder; fullback

Youth career
- –2008: VfB Stuttgart
- 2008: Panathinaikos

Senior career*
Years	Team	Apps	(Gls)
2008–2011	Panathinaikos	0	(0)
2011–2012	Ethnikos Achna	5	(0)
2013–2014	Eintracht Braunschweig II	24	(0)
2014–2015	Niki Volos	10	(0)
2015	Platanias	2	(0)
- * Club domestic league appearances and goals as of 4 February 2015

Georgios Mahlelis (Greek: Γεώργιος Μαχλελής; born 10 May 1991) is a former Greek / German footballer who last played for Platanias.

== Club career ==
=== Panathinaikos ===
Mahlelis was born in Waiblingen, Germany. In 2009, he was promoted to Panathinaikos first team by manager Henk Ten Cate and followed the team to Yverdon (district), Switzerland for the summer training. He played as right back defender and as defensive midfielder in the friendly games against SpVgg Greuther Fürth and Budapest Honvéd FC without being substituted, and as a last minutes substitute against TSG 1899 Hoffenheim.

Mahlelis was registered for the Champions league game against Sparta Prague (July 2009) in Prague, and for the Super League Greece 1st-round game against Ergotelis in Crete. Coach Henk Ten Cate seems to have faith in his abilities and will attempt to use him in the starting lineup in future games. The Dutch coach told the reporters "Panathinaikos is working for the future as well, bringing young and talented players who can develop to quality players. Perhaps the best example is Mahlelis. He just turned 18. I don't want to put pressure on him, but I believe that so far he is the best young player I have seen in Greece. He is very mature in his game, very intelligent and down to earth personality. One more thing is that he's a good fast learner and a hardworking individual. He's strong and well built, and i have high expectations for him. I will certainly keep him in the squad and he will get some games on his feet this year. He's a very good player with good tactics in his game".

=== Eintracht Braunschweig ===
During the 2013–14 Regionalliga season, Mahlelis played for the reserve side of Eintracht Braunschweig in Germany.

=== Niki Volos & Platanias ===
Mahlelis then joined Niki Volos for the 2014–15 Super League Greece season. On 23 August 2014 he made his debut in the Greek first-tier, in a 1–3 loss at Olympiacos F.C. On 30 January 2015 he signed a six months contract, with a possible year extension, with Super League club Platanias for an undisclosed fee. Unfortunately in his first game with the club against Asteras Tripolis, he faced an injury that kept him out of the squad for almost six months.

== International career ==
=== Greece U21 ===
Mahlelis was called up to the Greece U21 squad for the World Cup 2011 Qualifying game (8 September 2009) against England U21.

== Honours ==
=== Club ===
Panathinaikos

- Super League Greece: 2009–10
- Greek Football Cup: 2009–10
