= Ogden (name) =

Ogden is both a surname and a given name of English origin.

== Surname ==
- Aaron Ogden (1756–1839), American soldier, lawyer, United States Senator and fifth governor of New Jersey
- Abner Nash Ogden (1809–1875), American judge from Louisiana
- Aimee Ogden (born 1983), American writer and poet
- Alan Ogden (born 1954), English footballer
- Archie Ogden (born 1994), English cricketer
- Ben Ogden (born 2000), American cross-country skier
- Bradley Ogden, American chef
- Bud Ogden (born 1946), American former National Basketball Association player
- Carlos C. Ogden (1917–2001), United States Army officer and Medal of Honor recipient
- Chris Ogden (born 1980), American college basketball coach
- Clifford Ogden (1901–1968), American politician from Nebraska
- Craig Ogden (born 1967), Australian classical guitarist
- Curly Ogden (1901–1964), American Major League Baseball pitcher
- Darius A. Ogden (1813–1889), American lawyer and politician from New York
- Elias B. D. Ogden (1800–1865), American judge from New Jersey
- Eric Ogden (photographer), photographer
- Eric Ogden (politician) (1923–1997), British politician
- Ethel Ogden (1869–1902), Canadian painter and educator
- Eva L. Ogden (1853–1919), American writer and poet
- Graham Ogden (born 1938), Australian biblical scholar, theologian and priest
- Harry Ogden (1924–1980), English rugby league footballer
- Heather Ogden (born 1980), Canadian ballet dancer
- Henry Alexander Ogden (1856–1936), American illustrator
- Henry Warren Ogden (1842–1905), American politician from Louisiana
- Hugh Ogden (1937–2006), American poet and educator
- Jack Ogden (jewellery historian), British historian
- Jack Ogden (rugby league) (1923–2000), English rugby league player
- James Ogden (1868–1932), Australian politician from Tasmania
- James M. Ogden (1870–1956), American lawyer and politician from Indiana
- James de Peyster Ogden (1790–1870), American merchant and businessman
- Jeff Ogden (born 1975), American former National Football League player
- Jenni Ogden, New Zealand clinical neuropsychologist, writer and novelist
- Karen Ogden, Australian basketball player in the 1980s
- Louis Ogden (1867–1946), American lawyer and passenger aboard RMS Carpathia during the Titanic disaster
- Margaret Ogden (born 1952), American writer better known by her pen names Robin Hobb and Megan Lindholm
- Marques Ogden (born 1980), American former football offensive tackle and center
- Matthias Ogden (1754–1791), American colonel in the American War of Independence and politician from New Jersey
- Maureen Ogden (1928–2022), American politician from New Jersey
- Michael Ogden (1926–2003), British barrister
- Nigel Ogden (1954–2026), British theatre organist
- Ofahiki Ogden (born 1996), New Zealand rugby league footballer
- Paul Ogden (born 1946), English football coach and former player
- Percy Ogden (1886–1967), Australian rules footballer and coach
- Perry Ogden (born 1961), British fashion and documentary photographer and film director
- Peter Ogden (businessman) (born 1947), English businessman, one of the founders of Computacenter
- Peter Ogden (Odd Fellows founder) (died 1852), founder of the Grand United Order of Odd Fellows in America
- Peter Skene Ogden (1790–1854), British-Canadian fur trader and explorer
- Ralph Ogden (born 1948), American basketball player
- Raymond Ogden (born 1943), British applied mathematician
- Richard Ogden (jeweller) (1919–2005), British jeweller
- Richard C. Ogden, American attorney and district judge from Oklahoma
- Robert Curtis Ogden (1836–1913), American businessman and promoter of education in the South
- Robert Morris Ogden (1877–1959), American psychologist and academic
- Robert N. Ogden Jr. (1839–1905), American politician from Louisiana and Confederate lieutenant colonel
- Roger L. Ogden broadcasting executive
- Rollo Ogden (1856–1937), American journalist and newspaper editor
- Samuel Ogden (1746–1810), colonial businessman in New Jersey and colonel of militia in the American War of Independence
- Samuel Ogden (priest) (1716–1778), Anglican priest and preacher
- Schubert M. Ogden (1928–2019), American Protestant theologian
- Steve Ogden (born 1950), American businessman and politician
- Steven Ogden, Anglican priest in Australia, former Dean of Adelaide (2000–2008)
- Terry Ogden (1911–1935), Australian rules footballer
- Thomas Ogden (born 1946), American psychoanalyst and writer
- Trevor Ogden (footballer) (born 1945), English former footballer
- Uzal Ogden (1744–1822), American clergyman
- Val Ogden (1924–2014), American politician from Washington
- Vivia Ogden (1869–1952), American film and stage actress and producer
- Wesley Ogden (1818–1896), American judge from Texas
- William Augustine Ogden (1841–1897), American composer
- William B. Ogden (1805–1877), American politician from Illinois

=== Others ===
- Charles Ogden (disambiguation)
- David Ogden (disambiguation)
- Fred or Frederick Ogden (disambiguation)
- John Ogden (disambiguation)
- Jonathan Ogden (disambiguation)

== Given name ==
- J. Ogden Armour (1863–1927), American meatpacking magnate
- Ogden Bruton (1908–2003), American immunologist and pediatrician, chief of pediatrics at Walter Reed Army Hospital
- Ogden Codman Jr. (1863–1951), American architect and interior decorator
- Ogden Compton (1932–2020), American football quarterback
- Ogden Driskill (born 1959), American politician
- Ogden Goelet (1851–1897), American businessman and yachtsman
- Ogden H. Hammond (1869–1956), American businessman, politician and diplomat
- Ogden Hoffman (1794–1856), American lawyer and politician
- Ogden Hoffman Jr. (1822–1891), United States district judge, son of the above
- Ogden Kraut (1927–2002), American polygamist, author and publisher
- Ogden Lindsley (1922–2004), American psychologist, founder of Precision Teaching
- Ogden Mills (financier) (1856–1929), American businessman, father of Ogden L. Mills
- Ogden L. Mills (1884–1937), American lawyer, businessman, politician and Secretary of the Treasury
- Ogden Nash (1902–1971), American poet
- Ogden Phipps (1908–2002), American stockbroker, court tennis champion, thoroughbred horse racing executive, owner and breeder and art collector
- Ogden Mills Phipps (1940–2016), American financier, Thoroughbred racehorse industry executive, and horse breeder, son of the above
- Ogden Pleissner (1905–1983), American painter
- Ogden Mills Reid (1882–1947), American newspaper publisher
- Ogden R. Reid (1925–2019), American politician and diplomat
- Ogden Rood (1831–1902), American physicist
- Ogden Whitney (1919–1975), American comic-book artist and sometime writer

== Fictional characters ==
- Stan Ogden, in the British television series Coronation Street
- Hilda Ogden, in the British television series Coronation Street; wife of Stan
- Irma Ogden, in the British television series Coronation Street; daughter of Stan and Hilda
- Trevor Ogden (Coronation Street), in the British television series Coronation Street; son of Stan and Hilda
- Pauline "Polly" Ogden, in the British television series Coronation Street; wife of Trevor
- Damian Ogden, in the British television series Coronation Street; son of Trevor and Polly
- Dr. Julia Ogden, in the Canadian television series Murdoch Mysteries
- Ogden Ford, title character of The Little Nugget by P. G. Wodehouse
- Ogden Morrow, in the novel Ready Player One by Ernest Cline
- Ogden Wernstrom, in the animated television series Futurama

== See also ==
- Justice Ogden (disambiguation)
- Senator Ogden (disambiguation)
- John Ogdon, pianist
