= 1974–75 York City F.C. season =

Association football club season

York City F.C.
1974–75 season
- Chairman: Bob Strachan
- Manager: Tom Johnston (until 11 January 1975); Clive Baker (caretaker, from 11 January 1975 until 15 February 1975); Wilf McGuinness (from 15 February 1975)
- Ground: Bootham Crescent
- Football League Second Division: 15th
- FA Cup: Third round (eliminated by Arsenal)
- League Cup: First round (eliminated by Huddersfield Town)
- Top goalscorer: League: Jimmy Seal (17); All: Jimmy Seal (18)
- Highest home attendance: 15,362 vs Arsenal, FA Cup, 7 January 1975
- Lowest home attendance: 5,570 vs Huddersfield Town, League Cup, 21 August 1974
- Average home league attendance: 8,828

The 1974–75 season was the 53rd season of competitive association football and 46th season in the Football League played by York City Football Club, a professional football club based in York, North Yorkshire, England. They finished in fifteenth position in the 22-team 1974–75 Football League Second Division. They entered the 1974–75 FA Cup in the third round and lost to Arsenal, and entered the 1974–75 League Cup in the first round and lost to Huddersfield Town.

22 players made at least one appearance in nationally organised first-team competition, and there were 11 different goalscorers. Goalkeeper Graeme Crawford, defender Chris Topping and midfielder Ian Holmes played in all 45 first-team matches over the season. Jimmy Seal finished as leading goalscorer with 18 goals, of which 17 came in league competition and one came in the FA Cup.

== Match details ==
=== Football League Second Division ===
Football League Second Division match details
No.	Date	League position	Opponents	Venue	Result	Score F–A	Scorers	Attendance
1	17 August 1974	11th	Aston Villa	H	D	1–1	Lyons	9,396
2	24 August 1974	19th	Oxford United	A	L	1–3	Jones	6,249
3	27 August 1974	10th	Cardiff City	H	W	1–0	Jones	6,321
4	31 August 1974	12th	Notts County	H	D	2–2	Seal (2)	6,558
5	7 September 1974	9th	Fulham	A	W	2–0	Jones (2)	7,628
6	14 September 1974	10th	Sunderland	H	L	0–1		14,974
7	17 September 1974	7th	Oxford United	H	D	1–1	Holmes pen.	7,020
8	21 September 1974	8th	Blackpool	A	D	1–1	Seal	7,927
9	24 September 1974	9th	Bristol City	A	D	0–0		11,867
10	28 September 1974	6th	Portsmouth	H	W	3–0	Seal, Holmes, Wann	6,771
11	5 October 1974	9th	West Bromwich Albion	A	L	0–2		11,707
12	12 October 1974	7th	Bristol Rovers	H	W	3–0	Seal (2), Hinch	6,470
13	16 October 1974	7th	Cardiff City	A	L	2–3	Holmes (2, 2 pens.)	5,887
14	19 October 1974	5th	Oldham Athletic	A	W	3–2	Lyons, Holmes, Seal	12,141
15	26 October 1974	7th	Bolton Wanderers	H	L	1–3	Holmes pen.	9,581
16	1 November 1974	7th	Orient	H	L	0–1		8,538
17	9 November 1974	15th	Sheffield Wednesday	A	L	0–3		12,495
18	16 November 1974	13th	Millwall	H	W	2–1	Jones, Seal	6,391
19	23 November 1974	14th	Nottingham Forest	A	L	1–2	Jones	10,471
20	30 November 1974	14th	Norwich City	H	W	1–0	Seal	7,887
21	7 December 1974	14th	Southampton	A	L	1–2	Seal	13,500
22	14 December 1974	15th	Aston Villa	A	L	0–4		15,840
23	21 December 1974	17th	Manchester United	H	L	0–1		15,314
24	26 December 1974	17th	Sunderland	A	L	0–2		35,367
25	28 December 1974	17th	Hull City	H	W	3–0	Holmes (2, 2 pens.), Swallow	10,619
26	10 January 1975	15th	Southampton	H	D	1–1	Topping	9,562
27	18 January 1975	15th	Norwich City	A	W	3–2	Seal, Jones (2)	23,382
28	31 January 1975	13th	Sheffield Wednesday	H	W	3–0	Lyons (2), Butler	10,552
29	8 February 1975	16th	Orient	A	L	0–1		6,454
30	14 February 1975	14th	Nottingham Forest	H	D	1–1	Seal	7,666
31	22 February 1975	14th	Millwall	A	W	3–1	Jones (2), Cave	9,018
32	1 March 1975	16th	Notts County	A	L	1–2	Seal	8,835
33	8 March 1975	13th	Bristol City	H	W	1–0	Pollard	7,251
34	15 March 1975	14th	Portsmouth	A	L	0–1		9,906
35	22 March 1975	15th	Fulham	H	W	3–2	Jones (2), Holmes pen.	7,495
36	29 March 1975	15th	Manchester United	A	L	1–2	Seal	46,802
37	31 March 1975	16th	Hull City	A	L	0–2		10,095
38	1 April 1975	16th	Blackpool	H	D	0–0		8,744
39	5 April 1975	15th	Bolton Wanderers	A	D	1–1	Seal	7,876
40	12 April 1975	17th	West Bromwich Albion	H	L	1–3	Seal	8,181
41	19 April 1975	15th	Bristol Rovers	A	W	3–1	Topping, Swallow, Seal	11,841
42	26 April 1975	15th	Oldham Athletic	H	D	0–0		10,101

=== League table (part) ===
Final Football League Second Division (part)
Pos	Club	Pld	W	D	L	F	A	GA	Pts
13th	Southampton	42	15	11	16	53	54	0.98	41
14th	Notts County	42	12	16	14	49	59	0.83	40
15th	York City	42	14	10	18	51	55	0.93	38
16th	Nottingham Forest	42	12	14	16	43	55	0.78	38
17th	Portsmouth	42	12	13	17	44	54	0.81	37
Key	Pos = League position; Pld = Matches played; W = Matches won; D = Matches drawn; L = Matches lost; F = Goals for; A = Goals against; GA = Goal average; Pts = Points								
Source									

=== FA Cup ===
FA Cup match details
Round	Date	Opponents	Venue	Result	Score F–A	Scorers	Attendance
Third round	4 January 1975	Arsenal	A	D	1–1	Seal	27,029
Third round replay	7 January 1975	Arsenal	H	L	1–3 a.e.t.	Lyons	15,362

=== League Cup ===
League Cup match details
Round	Date	Opponents	Venue	Result	Score F–A	Scorers	Attendance
First round	21 August 1974	Huddersfield Town	H	L	0–2		5,570

== Appearances and goals ==
Numbers in parentheses denote appearances as substitute.
Players with names struck through and marked † left the club during the playing season.
Players with names in italics and marked * were on loan from another club for the whole of their season with York.
Key to positions: GK – Goalkeeper; DF – Defender; MF – Midfielder; FW – Forward

Players having played at least one first-team match
Pos.	Nat.	Name	League		FA Cup		League Cup		Total	
Pos.	Nat.	Name	Apps	Goals	Apps	Goals	Apps	Goals	Apps	Goals
GK	SCO	Graeme Crawford	42	0	2	0	1	0	45	0
DF	ENG	Cliff Calvert	21 (2)	0	2	0	0	0	23 (2)	0
DF	ENG	~~Mick Coop~~ * †	4	0	0	0	0	0	4	0
DF	ENG	Gordon Hunter	10	0	0	0	0	0	10	0
DF	ENG	Alan Ogden	7	0	2	0	0	0	9	0
DF	SCO	Peter Oliver	34	0	0 (1)	0	1	0	35 (1)	0
DF	ENG	Ian Robb	3	0	0	0	0	0	3	0
DF	ENG	John Stone	6	0	0	0	1	0	7	0
DF	ENG	Barry Swallow	37	2	2	0	1	0	40	2
DF	ENG	Chris Topping	42	2	2	0	1	0	45	2
MF	ENG	Ian Butler	24	1	2	0	1	0	27	1
MF	ENG	Micky Cave	39	1	0	0	1	0	40	1
MF	ENG	Ian Holmes	42	9	2	0	1	0	45	9
MF	ENG	Barry Lyons	30 (5)	4	2	1	1	0	33 (5)	5
MF	ENG	Brian Pollard	11 (1)	1	0	0	0	0	11 (1)	1
MF	ENG	Phil Taylor	0 (1)	0	0	0	0	0	0 (1)	0
MF	ENG	Dennis Wann	10 (1)	1	0	0	0	0	10 (1)	1
MF	SCO	John Woodward	12 (5)	0	2	0	0	0	14 (5)	0
FW	ENG	Jimmy Hinch	9 (7)	1	0	0	1	0	10 (7)	1
FW	ENG	Chris Jones	36 (1)	12	2	0	0	0	38 (1)	12
FW	ENG	~~John Peachey~~ †	2	0	0	0	0	0	2	0
FW	ENG	Jimmy Seal	41	17	2	1	1	0	44	18

== See also ==
- List of York City F.C. seasons
