= Ogden =

Ogden may refer to:

== Places ==
=== Canada ===
- Ogden, Calgary, Alberta, a neighbourhood in Calgary
- Ogdensville, British Columbia or Ogden City, alternate names for gold rush-era Seymour Arm
- Ogden, British Columbia, an unincorporated locality
- Ogden, Nova Scotia, a community
- Ogden, Quebec, a municipality in the Eastern Townships
- Ogden Point, a landmark breakwater, lighthouse and port facility in Victoria, British Columbia

=== England ===
- Ogden, West Yorkshire
- River Ogden, Lancashire, England
- Ogden Reservoir (disambiguation)

=== United States ===
- Ogden, Arkansas, a city
- Ogden, Illinois, a village
- Ogden Township, Champaign County, Illinois
- Ogden, Indiana, an unincorporated community
- Ogden, Iowa, a city
- Ogden, Kansas, a city
- Ogden Township, Riley County, Kansas
- Ogden, Michigan, an unincorporated community
- Ogden, Missouri, a ghost town
- Ogden, New York, a town
- Ogden, North Carolina, a census-designated place
- Ogden, Ohio, an unincorporated community
- Ogden, Utah, the largest city with the name
- Ogden, West Virginia, an unincorporated community
- Ogden Township, Michigan
- Ogden Center, Michigan, an unincorporated community
- Ogden Creek, New Jersey
- Mount Ogden, Utah
- Ogden River, Utah
- Ogden Canyon, Utah
- Ogden Valley, Utah

== Businesses ==
- AEG Ogden, a former Australian company that managed sports venues and convention centres
- Ogden Corporation, original name of Reworld, an American company
- Ogden Newspapers, an American publisher of newspapers, magazines, telephone directories and shoppers guides
- Ogden Theatre, Denver, Colorado

== Education ==
- Ogden Hall (Miami University), a residence hall
- Ogden International School, Chicago, Illinois, a public K-12 school
- Ogden High School, Ogden, Utah

== Sports ==
- Ogden (horse) (1894–1923), a British-American Thoroughbred racehorse
- Ogden A's, a former minor league baseball team based in Ogden, Utah
- Ogden Dodgers, a former minor league baseball team based in Ogden, Utah
- Ogden Mustangs, a junior ice hockey team based in Ogden, Utah
- Ogden Raptors, an independent baseball team based in Ogden, Utah

== Other uses ==
- Ogden (name), a surname and given name
- USS Ogden, two ships
- Ogden Avenue, Chicago, Illinois
- The Ogden, a condominium tower in Las Vegas, Nevada
- Ogden Museum of Southern Art, New Orleans, Louisiana
- Ogden (hyperelastic model), used in continuum mechanics

== See also ==
- Ogden House (disambiguation)
- Ogden syndrome, a genetic disorder affecting infants
- Ogden tables, actuarial tables produced by the United Kingdom Government Actuary's Department
- Ogden's lemma, a generalization of the pumping lemma for context-free languages
