= Lucy Walker =

Lucy Walker may refer to:

- Lucy Walker (director), English film director
- Lucy Walker (climber) (1836–1916), English mountaineer
- Lucy Walker (Latter Day Saint) (1826–1910), American wife of Mormon founder Joseph Smith
- Lucy Walker (writer) (1907–1987), Australian romance novelist
- Lucy Walker (composer) (born 1998)

== Incidents ==
- Lucy Walker steamboat disaster
