= List of Joseph Smith's wives =

Wives of founder of the Latter Day Saint movement

Joseph Smith (1805–1844), founder of the Latter Day Saint movement, taught and practiced religious polygamy, termed "plural marriage" during his adulthood, marrying an estimated 30 to 40 wives throughout his lifetime. (Note: Estimates vary, but most historians generally place the number of polygamous wives as between thirty and forty.) Smith and some of the top leaders of the church he founded publicly denied he taught or practiced it.

In 1852, leaders of the Church of Jesus Christ of Latter-day Saints (LDS Church) publicly acknowledged that Smith had practiced plural marriage and produced a statement of Smith's which he said was a revelation from God authorizing its practice. Smith's lawful widow Emma Smith, his son Joseph Smith III, and most members of the Community of Christ (formerly the Reorganized Church of Jesus Christ of Latter Day Saints, or RLDS Church) attempted for years to refute the evidence of plural marriages. They pointed to Smith's public statements opposing polygamy, and stated that plural marriage began in Utah under the leadership of Brigham Young.

The first publication of a list of those alleged to be Smith's plural wives was in 1887, by Andrew Jenson, an assistant LDS Church historian. It included 27 names besides Emma Smith. There are currently 49 wives on this list. However, historians disagree as to the number and identity of the polygamous wives Smith had. Various scholars and historians, including Fawn M. Brodie, George D. Smith, and Todd Compton, have attempted to identify the individuals who married Smith. The discrepancy is created by the lack of documents to support some of the reported marriages. Apart from his marriage to Emma, Smith's marriages were not solemnized under any civil authority and were therefore solely religious unions.

== List of reported wives ==
Timeline of Joseph Smith's marriages

Image	Plural wife's maiden name (married name)	Marriage date	Age	Recognized by			Marital status at time of sealing	Notes
Image	Plural wife's maiden name (married name)	Marriage date	Age	TC (Note: Wife recognized by Todd Compton)	GS (Note: Wife recognized by George D. Smith)	FB (Note: Wife recognized by Fawn Brodie. Unless otherwise noted, wives are listed in No Man Knows My History)	Marital status at time of sealing	Notes
	Emma Hale (Smith)	January 17, 1827	22	Yes	Yes	Yes	N/A	The only woman legally wed to Smith, who he claimed publicly was his only spouse, and the only union known to have produced offspring. Continued church activity within the RLDS Church. Throughout life and on her deathbed she denied that her husband had plural wives. Claimed that the very first time she ever became aware of a polygamy revelation being attributed to Smith was when she read about it in Orson Pratt's periodical The Seer in 1853. Emma Hale and Joseph Smith were sealed together on May 28, 1843.
	Fanny Alger	c. 1833–1837	16	Yes		Yes	Single	Alger's relationship with Smith was attested to by several people, including Emma Smith, Warren Parish, Oliver Cowdery, and Heber C. Kimball. Several Mormons including Benjamin F. Johnson, Heber C. Kimball and Andrew Jenson, and former Mormons Chauncey Webb and Ann Eliza Webb Young, regarded the relationship as a marriage. Compton cites Mosiah Hancock's handwritten report of his father Levi's account of the marriage ceremony of Smith and Alger, and records his father's account of negotiations between Levi and Smith in procuring their respective wives. Compton also notes that nineteenth-century Historian Lawrence Foster asserts a claim that later Mormons may have falsely assumed there was a marriage where there was only a sexual relationship: he views the marriage of Alger to Smith as a "debatable supposition". As Richard Bushman has noted, Smith "never denied a relationship with Alger, but insisted it was not adulterous. He wanted it on record that he had never confessed to such a sin." After Smith's death, when Alger's brother asked her about her relationship with Smith, she replied, "That is all a matter of my own. And I have nothing to communicate." Brian C. Hales documents three possible timelines for Alger's relationship: the relationship starts in 1832–33 and is shortly discovered; the relationship starts in 1832–33 and is not discovered until 1835–37; the relationship starts in 1835–37 and is shortly discovered.
	Lucinda Pendleton Morgan Harris	c. 1838–1842	37–41	Yes	Yes	Yes	Married	Compton notes the following evidence: she is the third woman on Andrew Jenson's 1887 list of Smith's plural wives; Compton writes that "Sarah Pratt reported that while in Nauvoo Lucinda had admitted a long-standing relationship with Smith", though Compton admits that this statement is "antagonistic, third-hand, and late"; and that there is an "early Nauvoo temple proxy sealing to Smith". This marriage was polyandrous, as Lucinda lived with her husband George Washington Harris until about 1853. Compton believes the marriage occurred around 1838, when Smith was living with Lucinda and her husband. Quinn gave this sealing a window of year between 1838 and 1842. Brian C. Hales notes the following weaknesses in the evidence: Andrew Jenson's notes for Lucinda say "better leave her out perhaps"; the timeline for Sarah Pratt's statement would put the start of the relationship in 1837 which is before Joseph and Lucinda even met. Hales writes "If a plural marriage occurred, I think it would have been in Nauvoo."
	Louisa Beaman	April 5, 1841	26	Yes	Yes	Yes	Single	(February 7, 1815 – May 16, 1850). Though Mormon history and press indicate Beaman was not baptized until May 11, 1843, she had migrated with Mormons to Nauvoo in 1839 or 1840. She has been called the "first plural wife of the Prophet Joseph Smith". After Smith's death, Beaman remarried, becoming the ninth wife of Brigham Young. Young and Beaman had five children together, all of whom predeceased Beaman, who died at age 35. Listed as a Smith plural wife by Joseph F. Smith, who noted an 1869 affidavit of Beaman's brother-in-law Joseph B. Noble, stating he officiated at the wedding. This would have been prior to her baptism. The marriage was done without informing Joseph's first wife Emma.
	Zina Diantha Huntington (Jacobs)	October 27, 1841	20	Yes	Yes	Yes	Married	Husband was Henry Bailey Jacobs, who was aware of her plural marriage to Smith. Jacobs wrote, "[W]hatever the Prophet did was right, without making the wisdom of God's authorities bend to the reasoning of any man." Sister of Presendia Huntington. After Smith's death, married Brigham Young while husband Jacobs was on mission to England.
	Presendia Lathrop Huntington (Buell)	December 11, 1841	31	Yes	Yes	Yes	Married	(September 7, 1810, in Watertown, New York – February 1, 1892, in Salt Lake City, Utah Territory). Sister of Zina. After Smith's death, married Heber C. Kimball.
	Agnes Moulton Coolbrith (Smith)	January 6, 1842	33	Yes	Yes	Yes	Widowed	Widow of Smith's brother Don Carlos. (1808–1876). After Don Carlos died in 1841, Coolbrith married Smith in 1842. Coolbrith was the mother of Ina Coolbrith, who became the first poet laureate of California.
	Sylvia Porter Lyon	February 8, 1842	23	Yes	Yes	Yes	Married	Daughter of David Sessions and Patty Bartlett Sessions, who married Smith one month after her daughter's marriage to him. On her deathbed, Sylvia informed her daughter Josephine Lyons that she was Smith's daughter, but genetic testing has contradicted this assertion.
	Mary Elizabeth Rollins Lightner	January 17, 1842	23	Yes	Yes	Yes	Married	(April 9, 1818, in Lima, New York – December 17, 1913, in Minersville, Utah). A letter from Mary in 1905 could be read that Smith had a private conversation with her in 1831 when she was twelve years old though in the same statement, she said that Smith did not talk to her till 1842, "It was at [Sister Whitney's] house that the Prophet Joseph first told me about his great vision concerning me. He said I was the first woman God commanded him to take as a plural wife, in 1831 .... It was in the early part of Feb, 1842 that he was compelled to reveal it to me personally". She left a statement in 1902 of her sealing with Joseph Smith, "In 1834 he was commanded to take me for a Wife, I was a thousand miles from him .... Brigham Young sealed me to him, for time and all eternity -- Feb. 1842" In 1835 she married another man, Adam Lightner a non-Mormon. They had two children and she was pregnant with her third at the time she was sealed to Joseph Smith in 1842. After the sealing she continued to live with her first husband Adam. Following the death of Joseph Smith Mary went briefly back to Nauvoo. In the fall of 1844 Brigham Young and Heber Kimball offered themselves to Smith's widows as proxy husbands and Mary accepted Young's proposal. She was sealed to him for time in a proxy marriage on May 22, 1845, though she continued to live with Adam. When Brigham Young and the church left Nauvoo to emigrate to Utah, Mary and Adam stayed behind. They eventually moved to Utah 17 years later settling in the town of Minersville. In her later years she would often supplicate the church for monetary assistance appealing to them on the basis of her connection with Joseph and Brigham. Mary Elizabeth and her sister Caroline were instrumental in salvaging printed pages of the Book of Commandments when the printing press was destroyed by a mob on July 20, 1833.
	Patty Bartlett (Sessions)	March 9, 1842	47	Yes	Yes	Yes	Married	(February 4, 1795, in Bethel, Massachusetts (now Maine) – December 14, 1893, in Bountiful, Utah Territory). Her daughter Sylvia Porter Sessions Lyon, who had married Smith one month before, was present at Sessions' wedding to Smith.
	Marinda Nancy Johnson (Hyde)	April 1842	26	Yes	Yes	Yes	Married	(June 28, 1815, in Pomfret, Vermont – March 24, 1886, in Salt Lake City, Utah Territory). Wife of Orson Hyde; daughter of John Johnson.
	Elizabeth Davis (Brackenbury Durfee)	Before June 1842	50	Yes	Yes	Yes	Married	(March 11, 1791, in Riverhead, New York – December 16, 1876, in White Cloud, Kansas). The statement made by Sarah Pratt was, "I don't think she was ever sealed to him, though it may have been the case after Joseph's death ... At all events, she boasted here in Salt Lake of having been one of Joseph's wives"
	Sarah Maryetta Kingsley (Howe Cleveland)	Before June 29, 1842	53	Yes	Yes	Yes	Married	(1788 – April 20, 1856, in Plymouth, Illinois).
	Delcena Johnson (Sherman)	Before July 1842	37	Yes	Yes	Yes	Single	(November 19, 1806, in Westfield, Vermont – October 21, 1854, in Salt Lake City, Utah Territory. Widow of Lyman R. Sherman). Married to Almon W. Babbitt after the death of Joseph Smith. Sister to Benjamin F. Johnson and Joel H. Johnson.
	Eliza Roxcy Snow	June 29, 1842	38	Yes	Yes	Yes	Single	Sister of Lorenzo Snow. Organized a petition in summer 1842, with a thousand female signatures, denying Smith a polygamist. As Secretary of the Ladies' Relief Society published a certificate in October 1842 denouncing polygamy. William Clayton said Smith told him in February 1843 that Snow was one of his plural wives. She was married to Brigham Young from 1844 until his death in 1877.
	Sarah Ann Whitney	July 27, 1842	17	Yes	Yes	Yes	Single	Whitney was born in Kirtland, Ohio, on March 22, 1825, to Newel K. Whitney and Elizabeth Whitney. Joseph Smith Jr. and Newel Whitney had a very close friendship. According to Brodie, after her parents were introduced to the principle of plural marriage by Smith, the marriage of Sarah to Smith was arranged with her parents' consent. (Note: Her own sworn statement, giving the date as July 27, 1842, was published along with a confirming affidavit sworn by her mother, in Joseph F. Smith Jr.: Blood Atonement and the Origin of Plural Marriage. It is said that she was the first woman given in plural marriage "by and with the consent of both parents".) Compton claims this marriage is believed to have been performed for the purpose of creating a "dynastic" link between the Whitney and Smith families in the afterlife and to be "very much a family activity". Nine months after her marriage to Smith, Sarah married Joseph C. Kingsbury in a civil ceremony. Joseph C. Kingsbury said he was "well aware" of this marriage. William Clayton listed her as one of Smith's wives whom he married in early May 1843. She was married to Heber C. Kimball from March 17, 1845, to June 22, 1868.
	Martha McBride (Knight)	August 1842	37	Yes	Yes	Yes	Single	Widow of Vinson Knight; later sealed to Heber C. Kimball.
	Sarah Bapson	1842			Yes	Unknown	Unknown	
	Ruth D. Vose (Sayers)	February 1843	34	Yes	Yes	Yes	Married	
	Flora Ann Woodworth	Spring 1843	16	Yes	Yes	Yes	Single	William Clayton listed her as one of Smith's wives whom he married in early May 1843.
	Emily Dow Partridge	March 4, 1843	19	Yes	Yes	Yes	Single	Daughter of Edward Partridge and sister of Eliza. After Smith's death, she married Brigham Young. William Clayton listed her as one of Smith's wives whom he married in early May 1843.
	Eliza Maria Partridge	March 8, 1843	22	Yes	Yes	Yes	Single	Daughter of Edward Partridge and sister of Emily. Eliza married after Smith's death, to Amasa M. Lyman, who was already husband to Eliza's older sister, Caroline. William Clayton listed her as one of Smith's wives whom he married in early May 1843.
	Almera Woodward Johnson	August 1843	30	Yes	Yes	Yes	Single	(October 12, 1812, in Westfield, Vermont – March 4, 1896, in Parowan, Utah). Widow of Samuel H. Prescott. Married to Reuben Barton (with who she had five children) in Nauvoo Illinois in 1845 after the martyrdom of Joseph Smith. Sister to Benjamin F. Johnson and Joel H. Johnson.
	Lucy Walker	May 1, 1843	17	Yes	Yes	Yes	Single	Wrote about her plural marriage to Smith, "In the year 1842 President Joseph Smith sought an interview with me, and said, 'I have a message for you, I have been commanded of God to take another wife, and you are the woman.' ... He asked me if I believed him to be a Prophet of God. ... He fully Explained to me the principle of plural or celestial marriage ... that it would prove an everlasting blessing to my father's house. ... [Joseph encouraged her to pray] 'that the grave would kindly receive me that I might find rest on the bosom of my dear [recently deceased] mother ... Why Should I be chosen from among thy daughters, Father I am only a child in years and experience.' And thus I prayed in the agony of my soul. ... [The marriage] was not a love matter—at least on my part it was not, but simply the giving up of myself as a sacrifice to establish that grand and glorious principle that God had revealed to the world."
	Sarah Lawrence	May 1843	17	Yes	Yes	Yes	Single	(May 13, 1826, in Pickering Township, Upper Canada – 1872) Sister of Maria.
	Maria Lawrence	May 1843	19	Yes	Yes	Yes	Single	(December 18, 1823, in Pickering Township, Upper Canada – ? in Nauvoo, Illinois). Sister of Sarah. After Smith's death, Lawrence married Brigham Young, becoming his sixteenth plural wife. They divorced in 1845, but remarried the following year.
	Helen Mar Kimball	May 1843	14	Yes	Yes	Yes	Single	Daughter of Heber C. Kimball. Helen Mar Kimball wrote a full account of her experience in which she states: [My father] asked me if I would be sealed to Joseph ... [Smith] said to me, 'If you will take this step, it will ensure your eternal salvation & exaltation and that of your father's household & all of your kindred.['] This promise was so great that I willingly gave myself to purchase so glorious a reward. William Clayton listed her as one of Smith's wives whom he married in early May 1843.
	Hannah Ells	1843	29	Yes	Yes	Unknown	Single	(March 4, 1813, in New York City, New York – 1844 in Nauvoo, Illinois)
	Elvira Annie Cowles (Holmes)	June 1, 1843	29	Yes	Yes	Yes	Married	(November 23, 1813, in Unadilla, New York – March 10, 1871, in Farmington, Utah Territory).
	Rhoda Richards	June 12, 1843	58	Yes	Yes	Yes	Single	(August 8, 1784, in Framingham, Massachusetts – January 17, 1879, in Salt Lake City, Utah Territory). First cousin of Brigham Young, whom she married after Smith's death.
	Desdemona Wadsworth Fullmer	July 1843	32	Yes	Yes	Yes	Single	Born to Peter and Susannah on October 6, 1809, in Huntington, Luzerne County, Pennsylvania. Desdemona was baptized into the Church of the Latter Day Saints herself by John P. Greene in 1836. Desdemona was one of the church members that were present when a mob attacked Haun's Mill on October 30, 1838. She was "secreted in the woods near by", along with members of her family. In July 1842, Brigham Young officiated the marriage of Desdemona to Smith. as Smith took Desdemona as a plural wife and became part of an early group wives taken by Smith After Smiths death, Desdemona married Ezra T. Benson on January 26, 1846, in the Nauvoo Temple The marriage was only "for time", instead of being for "time and all eternity", meaning that Desdemona was sealed to Smith in the afterlife but would be married to Benson until one of them died. Upon her death, a few newspapers outside of Utah reported Desdemona's passing, remembering her as one of Joseph Smith's wives.
	Olive Grey Frost	poss. September 17, 1843	27	Yes	Yes	Yes	Single	(July 24, 1816, in Bethel, Massachusetts (now Maine) – October 6, 1845, in Nauvoo, Illinois). After Smith's death, Frost became the eighteenth plural wife of Brigham Young. They married "for time only" on November 7, 1844; they had no children.
	Mary Ann Frost (Pratt)	c. Summer 1843	34	No	Yes	Yes	Married	(January 14, 1809, in Groton, Vermont – August 24, 1891, in Pleasant Grove, Utah Territory). Sister of Olive Grey Frost. First married to Nathan Stearns in 1831 but he died about 18 months later. Baptized into Church of the Latter Day Saints in 1835 by David W. Patten. Married Parley P. Pratt on May 14, 1837, in Kirtland, Ohio. Moved to Missouri and Nauvoo with Pratt. Went on mission trip with Pratt to England in 1840. Returned from England without Pratt and was divorced soon after Pratt's return. Mary Ann was married to Parley Pratt for time and Joseph Smith (posthumously) for eternity on February 6, 1846, by Heber C. Kimball in the Nauvoo Temple. Emigrated with the Harmon Cutler Company to Utah Territory in 1852. She obtained a divorce from Pratt in 1853. She was accompanied by her daughter Olivia Pratt (b. 1841) and son Moroni Llewellyn Pratt (b. 1844). They settled in Pleasant Grove.
	Melissa Lott	September 20, 1843	19	Yes	Yes	Yes	Single	Daughter of early Mormon leader Cornelius P. Lott, who managed Smith's farm in Nauvoo.
	Nancy Maria Winchester	1842 or 1843	14	Yes	Yes	Yes	Single	Daughter of Stephen Winchester, Sr. of Vershire, Vermont (who was a member of the Danite militia and the Quorum of the Seventy), and his wife Nancy Case of Argyle, New York.
	Fanny Young (Murray)	November 2, 1843	56	Yes	Yes	Yes		(November 8, 1787, in Hopkinton, Massachusetts – June 11, 1859). Wife of Roswell Murray
	Mary Houston	Before 1844		No	Yes	Unknown	Unknown	
	Sarah Scott	Before 1844		No	Yes	Yes	Unknown	
	Olive Andrews	Before 1844		No	Yes	Yes	Unknown	
	Jane Tippets	Before 1844	78	No	Yes	Yes	Unknown	
	Sophia Sanburn	Before 1844		No	Yes	Unknown	Unknown	
	Phoebe Watrous (Woodworth)	Before 1844	Unknown	No	Yes	Yes	Unknown	
	Vienna Jaques	Before 1844	Unknown	No	Yes	Yes	Unknown	
	Clarissa Reed Hancock	March 29, 1833	19			Yes		
	Sally Ann Fuller		Unknown	No	No	Yes	Single	"Fawn Brodie asserts that Mrs. G***** was Sally Ann Fuller Gulley is Sally Ann Fuller Gulley. Sally Ann Fuller did not marry Samuel Gully until January 29, 1847"
	(Mrs Blossom)		Unknown			Yes		Wife of Edward Blossom
	Mary Huston		Unknown			Yes		
	Cordelia Calista Morley		22			Yes		In the spring of 1844, plural marriage was introduced to me by my parents from Joseph Smith, asking their consent and a request to me to be his wife. Imagine, if you can, my feeling, to be a plural wife. Something I never thought I could ever be. I knew nothing of such religion and could not accept it, neither did I then. I told Joseph I had a sweetheart; his name was Whiting, and I expected to marry him. He, however, was left by the wayside. He could not endure the persecutions and hardships. I told the Prophet I thought him a wonderful man and leader, but I wanted to marry my sweetheart. After Joseph Smith's death, I was visited by some of his most intimate friends who knew of his request and explained to me this religion, counseling me to accept his wishes, for he now was gone and could do no more for himself. I accepted Joseph Smith's desire, and 27 January 1846, I was married to your father in the Nauvoo Temple. While still kneeling at the altar, my hand clasped in his and ready to become his third plural wife, Heber C. Kimball tapped me on the shoulder and said, "Cordelia, are you going to deprive the Prophet of his desire that you be his wife?" At that, Walter Cox said, "You may be sealed to the Prophet for eternity and I'll marry you for time." Walter was proxy for Joseph Smith, and I was sealed to him for eternity and to Walter for time. (One time when Cordelia told this story to her granddaughter, Mary Verona Cox, she said, "Verona, in eternity I want the man that was the father of my children and was a good husband and father. I lived with him and loved him.")
	Nancy Maria Smith		Unknown			Yes		
	Jane Tibbets		Unknown			Yes		
	Sophia Woodman		Unknown			Yes		

== Allegations of children born to polygamous wives ==
Research by Ugo A. Perego, a geneticist and member of the LDS Church, has shown that a number of children of Smith's alleged polygamous relationships were not his genetic offspring. The following table lists some of the children born to Smith's alleged polygamous wives as well as those ruled out by genetic testing:

Child	Date of birth	Mother	Father (traditionally assumed)	DNA testing status	DNA testing result	Notes
Oliver Buell	1838–39	Presendia Huntington Buell	Norman Buell	Completed; November 2007	Negative	Historian Fawn Brodie speculated that Buell was a polygamous son of Smith.
John Reed Hancock	April 19, 1841	Clarissa Reed Hancock	Levi Hancock	Completed; July 2011	Negative	Only anecdotal evidence that Clarissa Reed Hancock was a plural wife of Smith.
Mosiah Hancock	April 9, 1834	Clarissa Reed Hancock	Levi Hancock	Completed; November 2007	Negative	Only anecdotal evidence that Clarissa Reed Hancock was a plural wife of Smith.
Frank Henry Hyde	January 23, 1845 or 1846	Marinda Johnson Hyde	Orson Hyde	Incomplete	?	
Orson Washington Hyde	November 9, 1843	Marinda Johnson Hyde	Orson Hyde	Not possible, died in infancy	n/a	
Zebulon Jacobs	January 2, 1842	Zina Huntington Jacobs	Henry Jacobs	Completed; May 2005	Negative	
George Algernon Lightner	March 22, 1842	Mary Elizabeth Rollins Lightner	Adam Lightner	Not possible, died in infancy	n/a	
Josephine Rosetta Lyon	February 8, 1844	Sylvia Porter Sessions Lyon	Windsor Lyon	Completed; June 2016	Negative	Not long before dying, Sylvia Lyon told Josephine that she was Smith's daughter.
Moroni Pratt	December 7, 1844	Mary Ann Frost Stearns Pratt	Parley P. Pratt	Completed; May 2005	Negative	

== See also ==
- Children of Joseph Smith
- List of Latter Day Saint practitioners of plural marriage
- List of Brigham Young's wives
