= John Ogden =

John or Jack Ogden may refer to:

- John Ogden (colonist) (1609-1682), American colonial leader
- John Ogden (actor) (died 1732), British stage actor
- John B. Ogden (1812–after 1889), American judge
- John Ogden (academic) (1824–1910), American minister, educator and abolitionist, co-founder of Fisk University, Nashville
- John William Ogden (1862-1930), British trade unionist
- Jack Ogden (baseball) (1897–1977), American Major League Baseball pitcher
- John Ogden (photographer), 20th-21st century Australian photographer and cinematographer
- Jack Ogden (rugby league) (1923–2000), English rugby league player
- Jack Ogden (jewellery historian), British jewellery historian
- John Ogden (ecologist), New Zealand ecologist, botanist and Fellow of the Royal Society Te Apārangi

== See also ==
- Jonathan Ogden (disambiguation)
- John Ogdon (1937–1989), pianist
