= Richard Ogden =

Richard Ogden may refer to:

- Richard Ogden (jeweller) (1919–2005), British jeweller
- Richard C. Ogden, American attorney and district judge
