= William Ogden =

William Ogden may refer to:

- William Augustine Ogden (1841–1897), American composer
- William B. Ogden (1805–1877), American politician and first mayor of Chicago

== See also ==
- Bill Ogden, a character in the 1953 war film Background
- Will Ogdon, American composer
- Ogden (disambiguation)
