= Justice Ogden =

Justice Ogden may refer to:

- Abner Nash Ogden (1809–1875), associate justice of the Louisiana Supreme Court
- Elias B. D. Ogden (1800–1865), associate justice of the New Jersey Supreme Court
- Wesley Ogden (1818–1896), associate justice of the Texas Supreme Court

== See also ==
- Ogden (disambiguation)
