= Parley P. Pratt =

Early leader of the Latter Day Saint movement (1807–1857)

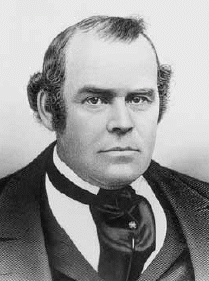
- Pratt, ca. 1845

Quorum of the Twelve Apostles
- February 21, 1835 – May 13, 1857
- Called by: Three Witnesses

LDS Church Apostle
- February 21, 1835 – May 13, 1857
- Called by: Three Witnesses
- Reason: Initial organization of Quorum of the Twelve
- Reorganization at end of term: George Q. Cannon ordained

Personal details
- Born: Parley Parker Pratt; April 12, 1807; Burlington, New York, United States
- Died: May 13, 1857 (aged 50); Alma, Arkansas, United States
- Relatives: Pratt family

Parley Parker Pratt Sr. (April 12, 1807 – May 13, 1857) was an early leader of the Latter Day Saint movement whose writings became a significant early nineteenth-century exposition of the Latter-Day Saint faith. Named in 1835 as one of the first members of the Quorum of the Twelve Apostles, Pratt was part of the Quorum's successful mission to Great Britain from 1839 to 1841. Pratt has been called "the Apostle Paul of Mormonism" for his promotion of distinctive Mormon doctrines.

Pratt explored and surveyed Parley's Canyon in Salt Lake City, Utah (named in his honor), and subsequently built and maintained the first road for public transportation in the canyon.

Pratt practiced plural marriage. He was murdered in 1857 by the estranged husband of his twelfth wife. Pratt fathered thirty children. His living descendants in 2011 were estimated to number 30,000 to 50,000. He is the great-great-grandfather of Mitt Romney, the 2012 Republican candidate for President of the United States, and Jon Huntsman Jr., diplomat and former Governor of Utah, who served as the U.S. Ambassador to Russia from 2017 to 2019.

== Early life and education ==
Pratt was born in Burlington, New York, to Jared Pratt (1769–1839) and his wife, Charity Dickinson (1776–1849), a descendant of Anne Hutchinson. He married Thankful Halsey in Canaan, New York, on September 9, 1827.

The young couple migrated west, where they settled near Cleveland, Ohio, where Pratt purchased land and constructed a home. In Ohio, Pratt became a member of the Reformed Baptist Society, also called "Disciples of Christ", influenced by the preaching of Sidney Rigdon. Pratt soon left his property to take up the ministry as a profession.

== Latter Day Saint service ==
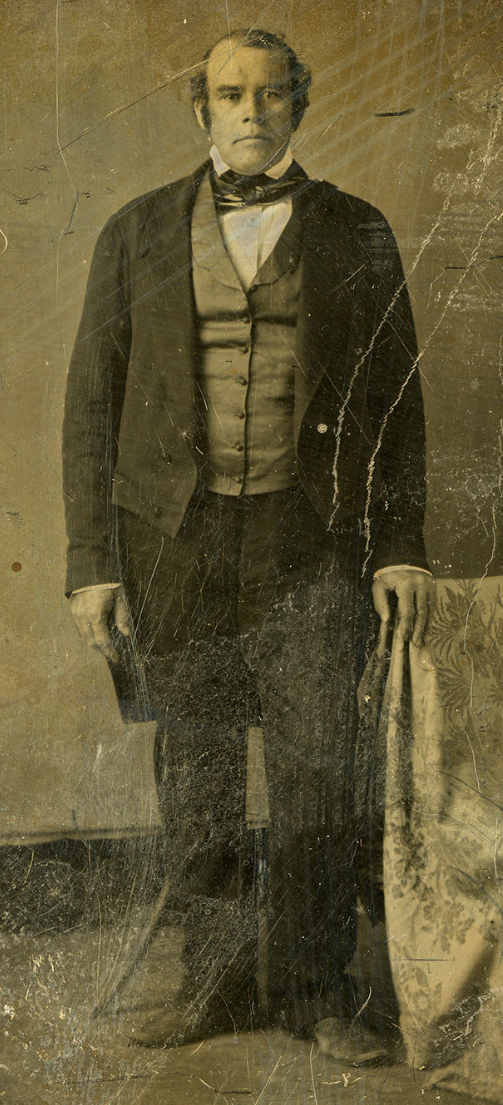
Pratt sometime between 1852 and 1856

During his youth, Pratt had difficulty accepting prevailing Christian doctrines being taught by various churches. In early 1830 while seeking religious truth through prayer and study, Pratt declared that "the prophecies of the holy prophets were open to my view" and he sensed a strong prompting to preach what he had learned. In August 1830, Pratt and his wife Thankful left their farm near Cleveland, Ohio and headed east toward their childhood home in Canaan, New York. Along their journey on the Erie Canal between Buffalo and Albany, New York, Parley told his wife that he felt compelled to disembark at Newark, New York and told her to continue on to Albany. It was in Newark that Pratt met a Baptist deacon who spoke of the Book of Mormon and lent Pratt his copy of the book. Convinced of its authenticity, Pratt traveled a short distance to Palmyra, and spoke to Hyrum Smith. Pratt was baptized in Seneca Lake by Oliver Cowdery on or about September 1, 1830, formally joining the church. He was also ordained to the office of elder. Continuing on to his family's home, he introduced his younger brother, Orson Pratt, to Mormonism and baptized him on September 19, 1830.

Arriving in Fayette, New York, in October 1830, Pratt met Joseph Smith and was asked to join a missionary group assigned to preach to the Native American tribes on the Missouri frontier. During the trip west, he and his companions stopped to visit Sidney Rigdon. They were instrumental in converting Rigdon and approximately 130 members of his congregation within three weeks. Pratt became close friends with the Smiths, particularly Joseph, with whom he would later experience persecution and imprisonment, including incarceration at Liberty Jail.

In early 1833, Pratt served as a missionary in Illinois. He went to Jackson County, Missouri, where through the summer he headed the School of the Elders, a gathering of about 60 men who studied religious and secular subjects, similar to the School of the Prophets in Kirtland, Ohio. In the fall of 1833, he served as president of the Mormon branch number 8 in Jackson County and as a leader in the Mormon militia. He was among those Latter Day Saints driven into Clay County, Missouri, by mob violence. In February 1834, Pratt and Lyman Wight headed back to Kirtland to report on the events in Missouri to Joseph Smith. From Kirtland, Pratt traveled with Smith in Pennsylvania and western New York, preaching and recruiting people to serve in Zion's Camp. After traveling together for three weeks, during some of this time with Pratt serving as Smith's scribe, Smith returned to Kirtland from Geneseo, New York, for a court case. Pratt continued his missionary efforts along with Henry Brown. Pratt and Brown went to eastern New York to give his family members money to move to Kirtland. They went to Richland, New York, where Pratt convinced Wilford Woodruff, who had been baptized three months before, to join Zion's Camp.

Pratt returned to Missouri later in 1834 as a member of Zion's Camp. After Zion's Camp broke up, Pratt rejoined his wife, Thankful, who had remained in Clay County while he had been traveling. While working as a day laborer, Pratt served on the Missouri High Council. Thankful had run up large debts in Pratt's absence, and when he returned with her to Ohio, some felt he was trying to flee his creditors and criticized him for it. Pratt settled in New Portage, Ohio (now part of Barberton), where he was the leader of a group of Latter-day Saints there.

=== More missionary service ===
In 1835, after his call as an apostle, Pratt served with other apostles in a mission to New York, New England, and eastern Canada. Pratt preached in Upper Canada, in and around Toronto, in 1836. In 1837 and 1838, he preached in New York City.

Pratt later served as a missionary in the southern United States and in England, the Pacific islands, and South America. He moved to Chile to begin missionary work in Valparaíso. In 1852, Pratt and his family left Chile after the death of their child, Omner, having had little success among the country's Catholic residents.

In addition to converting his brother Orson and preacher Sidney Rigdon, Parley Pratt introduced the Mormon faith to several future church leaders, including Frederick G. Williams, John Taylor and his wife, Leonora, Isaac Morley, and Joseph Fielding, along with his sisters, Mary and Mercy.

=== Apostle ===
In 1835, Pratt entered the leadership of the early Latter Day Saint movement when he was selected as one of the original Quorum of Twelve Apostles. While on a mission to the British Isles in 1839, Pratt edited the newly created periodical, Millennial Star. While presiding over the church's branches and interests in New England and the mid-Atlantic states, Pratt published a periodical entitled The Prophet from his headquarters in New York City.

=== Missouri War ===
After serving as a missionary in New York City, Pratt returned to church headquarters in Missouri in 1838. He was arrested in November 1838 for the murder of Missouri Militiaman Moses Rowland and the mutilation of Missouri Militiaman Samuel Tarwater at the Battle of Crooked River. Imprisoned alongside Joseph Smith, he was held in prison in Richmond and then Columbia until escaping on July 4, 1839. His writings during this and other imprisonments with Smith comprise many first accounts and stories preserved about Smith.

== Writer ==
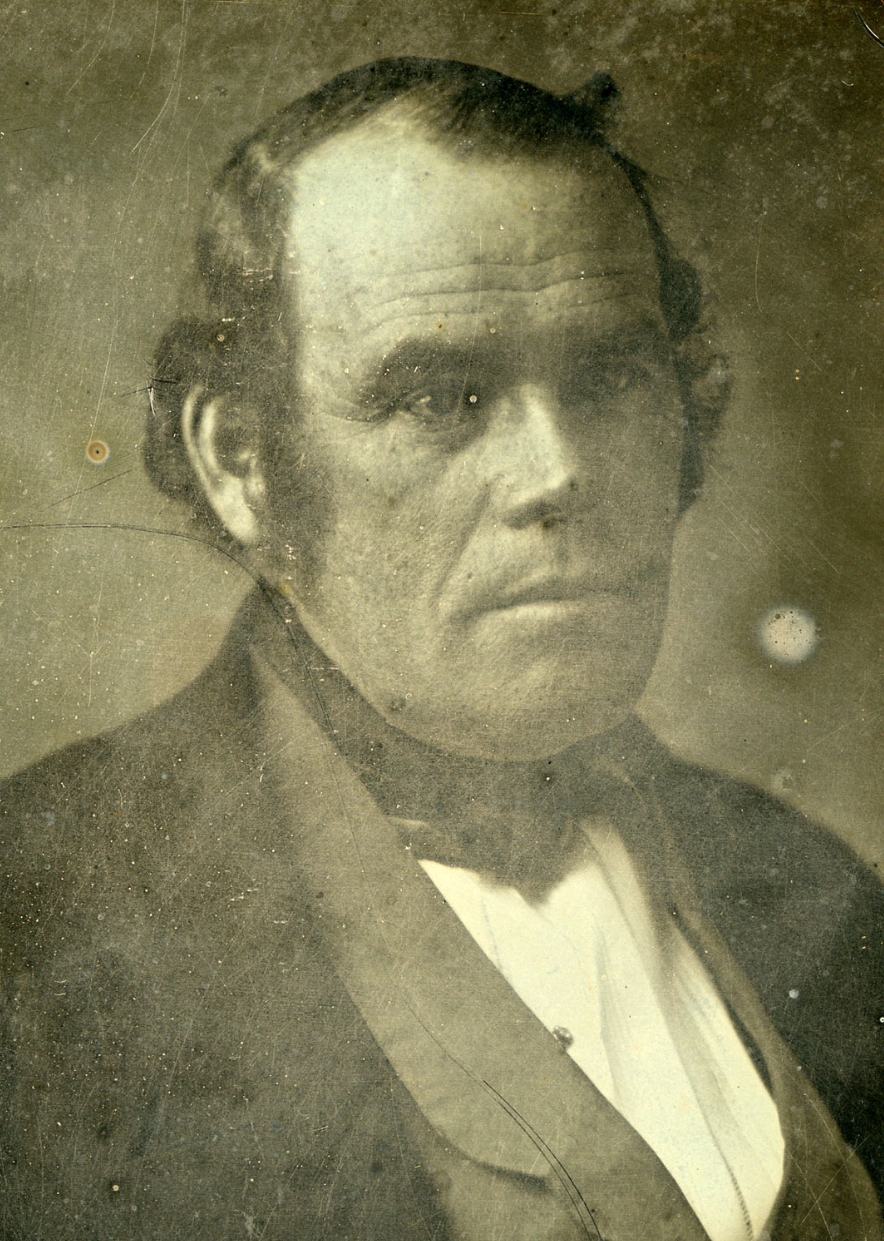
Pratt between 1852 and 1856

Pratt was a noted religious writer and poet. Many of Pratt's writings are the only credible or lasting accounts from important American and Mormon events, such as the Hauns Mill Massacre and the events and conditions of imprisonment with Smith at Liberty Jail.

Pratt's first printed work was "'The Mormons' So Called", a 5500-word account of the persecution of Mormons in Jackson County in 1833.

Pratt wrote an autobiography, published after his death but likely his most widely read work in the 21st century. He published a book of poetry in 1835, the first collection of poems by a Latter-day Saint. Some of his poems have become staple Latter Day Saint hymns, some of which are included in the current hymnal of the Church of Jesus Christ of Latter-day Saints (LDS Church). Pratt wrote many of these hymns in 1839 while sailing to England to serve as a missionary. He was involved in compiling a hymnal with 40 hymns of his own work while editor of the Millennial Star.

In 1835, Pratt published a pamphlet about his missionary efforts in Mentor, Ohio. This work, entitled "A Short Account of a Shameful Outrage", was the first pamphlet ever published by a Mormon.

One of Pratt's most influential works was a book entitled A Voice of Warning (1837), first published in New York City. Givens and Grow say the book was "a work that served the church as its most powerful proselytizing tool—after the Book of Mormon—for more than a century." Pratt made substantial revisions between the first and second editions after Joseph Smith voiced some reservations about it. The second edition of A Voice of Warning was published in 1839.

In 1837, Pratt, along with John Goodson, published the second edition of the Book of Mormon. It included Pratt's testimony, along with that of the three and eight witnesses to the golden plates.

Near the end of 1837, Pratt published Mormonism Unveiled: Zion's Watchman Unmasked, which is the earliest surviving response by a Mormon to an anti-Mormon writer.

Pratt also wrote one of the earliest Mormon works of fiction. His "A Dialogue between Joseph Smith and the Devil", was published on January 1, 1844, in the New York Herald. It was a religious treatise in fictional form.

Pratt's most well-known theological work was A Key to Science of Theology, which was published in 1855. Other works by Pratt included Late Persecutions, Millennium and Other Poems, at least ten tracts published while he served as editor of the Millennial Star, and "Proclamation to the People of the Coasts and Islands of the Pacific", written by Pratt in the summer of 1851 in San Francisco, California, and published by W. C. Wandell in Sydney, Australia.

Pratt's Visions and Poetry also serve as the text for many songs now found in the Latter Day Saint Hymnal. Pratt's writings also corroborate many events and revelations which are found in a book of Latter Day Saint scripture known as the Doctrine and Covenants.

In total, Pratt is known to have written 31 published works, not including his posthumous autobiography.

== Journey to Utah ==
After the death of Joseph Smith, Pratt and his family were among the Latter Day Saints who emigrated to what would become Utah Territory. They continued as members of LDS Church, under the direction of Brigham Young. Pratt helped establish the refugee settlements and fields at both Garden Grove and Mt. Pisgah, Iowa. He personally led a pioneer company along the Mormon Trail to the Salt Lake Valley.

== Life in Utah ==
In 1849, Pratt was appointed one of the justices of the anticipated state of Deseret. He later served in the legislature of the provisional state of Deseret beginning in 1849. During this same time, as one of the seven members of the Quorum of the Twelve in Utah, he was among those who oversaw the division of Salt Lake City into wards and the organization of other wards in Utah.

Sometime in the mid-1850s, working with George D. Watt, Pratt helped develop the Deseret alphabet. In 1854, Pratt went to San Francisco, California, to preside over the LDS Church's Pacific Mission.

After the organization of Utah Territory, Pratt served intermittently in the territorial legislature. In 1852, he was elected to the Territorial Council in a special election. He was re-elected in 1853, but only attended the 1853-54 session and did not return for the second year of his term. For the 1855-56 session, although not a member of the council, he did serve as its chaplain. In 1856, he was again elected to a seat on the council, but resigned before the session to leave on a mission.

== Death and legacy ==
In 1856, Pratt went on a mission to the eastern United States. At that time, troubles were brewing in Pratt's life. Hector McLean was the estranged husband of one of Pratt's plural wives, Eleanor McLean. Pratt had met Eleanor in San Francisco, where he presided over a church mission. In San Francisco, Eleanor had joined the LDS Church and had also had her oldest sons baptized. Hector rejected Mormonism and opposed his wife's membership in the church. Though they did not divorce, the dispute led to the collapse of their marriage.

Fearing that Eleanor would abscond to Utah Territory with their children, Hector sent his sons and daughter to New Orleans, Louisiana, to live with their maternal grandparents. Eleanor followed the children to New Orleans, where she lived with them for three months at her parents' house. Eventually, she and the children left for Utah Territory, via Texas; they arrived in Salt Lake City on September 11, 1855. She worked in Pratt's home as a schoolteacher. On November 14, 1855, she and Pratt underwent a celestial marriage sealing ceremony in the Endowment House. She was the twelfth woman to be sealed to Pratt. For religious and cultural reasons, Eleanor considered herself unmarried at the time of her sealing to Pratt, but she had not legally divorced from Hector.

While Pratt was serving a mission in the eastern states, Eleanor went to New Orleans to get her children. Eleanor then took the children from her parents and headed to Texas. This was at the same time that Pratt was serving as a missionary in New Jersey, Pennsylvania, and Ohio. Because Eleanor took the children, Hector blamed Pratt.

Hector pressed criminal charges, accusing Pratt of assisting in the kidnapping of his children. Pratt managed to evade him and the legal charges, but was finally arrested in Indian Territory (now Oklahoma) in May 1857. Pratt and Eleanor McLean were charged with theft of the clothing of McLean's children. (The laws of that time did not recognize the kidnapping of children by a parent as a crime.) Tried before Judge John B. Ogden, Pratt was acquitted because of a lack of evidence and Ogden's own feelings after interviewing Eleanor. Ogden sympathized with Eleanor and Pratt, because he was so disgusted by Hector's drinking and wife-beating. Shortly after being secretly released, on May 13, 1857, Pratt was shot and stabbed by Hector on a farm northeast of Van Buren, Arkansas. He died two and a half hours later from loss of blood.

As Pratt was bleeding to death, a farmer asked what he had done to provoke the attack. Pratt said, "He accused me of taking his wife and children. I did not do it. They were oppressed, and I did for them what I would do for the oppressed any where." Pratt was buried near Alma, Arkansas, despite his desire to be buried in Utah Territory.

Some writers have viewed Pratt's death as the act of a jealous husband, deeply angered by a man who had "run off" with his wife. A 2008 Provo Daily Herald newspaper article characterized McLean as a man who had "hunted down" Pratt in retribution for "ruining his marriage". A 2008 Deseret News article described McLean as a man who had "pursued Pratt across Missouri, Oklahoma and Arkansas, angry that his estranged wife, Eleanor, had become Pratt's 12th wife."

Many Mormons viewed Pratt's death as a martyrdom; his dying words were said to be, "I am dying a martyr to the faith." A 2007 article in the Deseret Morning News said that "Pratt was killed near Van Buren, Ark., in May 1857, by a small Arkansas band antagonistic toward his teachings". The historian Will Bagley reports that McLean and two friends tracked Pratt after he was released by Van Buren's magistrate. Brigham Young compared Pratt's death to those of Joseph and Hyrum Smith. Other Mormons blamed the death on the state of Arkansas, or its people.

Due to Pratt's personal popularity and his position in the Quorum of the Twelve, his murder was a significant blow to the Latter-day Saint community in the Rocky Mountains. Pratt's violent death may also have played a part in events leading up to the Mountain Meadows massacre a few months later. After the massacre, some Mormons circulated rumors that one or more members of the party had murdered Pratt, poisoned creek water that subsequently sickened Paiute children, and allowed their cattle to graze on private property.

Pratt was one of the better known Mormons among other Americans; for instance, in his 1864-published visit to the Mormons, Fitz-Hugh Ludlow, in The Atlantic made a joke about "Mrs. Deacon Pratt" and referred to "Parley's Cañon (named after the celebrated Elder, Parley Pratt)."

In 2008, Pratt's family received permission from an Arkansas judge to rebury his remains in the Salt Lake City Cemetery, but no human remains were found at what was believed his gravesite. No further search efforts for Pratt's burial site have been planned.

== Family ==
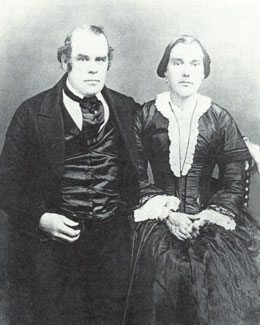
Parley P. Pratt with his wife Elizabeth Brotherton

Pratt practiced plural marriage and had 12 wives, 30 children, and 266 grandchildren. In 2011, Pratt's living descendants were estimated to number 30,000 to 50,000. His first wife, Thankful Halsey Pratt, died following childbirth in March 1837. (Thankful was a widow ten years older than Pratt when she married him.) Pratt did, however, marry women averaging ten years younger than himself, the greatest age difference occurring with his marriage to his Ann Agatha Walker who was 18 to his 40 years.

On May 14, 1837, Pratt married his second wife, Mary Ann Frost Stearns (1808–1891), a widow with a daughter. The marriage was performed by Frederick G. Williams. Mary Ann was a native of Bethel, Maine (part of Massachusetts until 1820) whose first relative to join the church was Patty Bartlett Sessions, later a prominent midwife in Utah. Mary Ann was baptized by David W. Patten. She had come to Kirtland as a widow in 1836. Joseph Smith later condemned Latter-Day Saints for "marrying in five or six weeks, or even in two or three months, after the death of their companion." Pratt may have married Mary Ann so quickly to get back his infant son, although he remained in the care of Mary Ann Young for nearly a year after Pratt remarried. Mary Ann and Pratt at times demonstrated a deep companionship in their marriage, most fully shown by her joining her husband in prison in Missouri. After Pratt began practicing polygamy, they became estranged. Pratt suggested his falling out with Mary Ann was "stung by falsehoods which are circulated in the Church".

Some sources state that in 1843, Mary Ann Pratt married Joseph Smith, the church's founder. This marriage, however, does not appear on most lists of Smith's marriages so is unsubstantiated. Olive would marry Smith's successor, Brigham Young, after Smith's death in 1844.

Pratt made several attempts to get Mary Ann to join him in traveling west in 1846 and 1847, but after spending the winter of 1846–47 in an abandoned Nauvoo, she chose to return to Maine. Pratt provided her with clothes and money upon her return to Maine. She received some of the proceeds from the sale of Pratt's home to a Roman Catholic priest; the Nauvoo home is still used as a residence for Catholic priests. In 1852, Mary Ann traveled to Utah Territory, but she and Pratt did not see eye to eye on how to raise their children. Mary Ann received a divorce decree issued by Brigham Young in 1853. Mary Ann then settled in what is now Pleasant Grove, Utah. She worked as a midwife, remained in the LDS Church, and became a leading advocate for LDS women against the attacks of those opposed to plural marriage.

In the fall of 1853, Pratt had seven living wives. These wives were:

Wife	Life	Date married Pratt	Children together
Elizabeth Brotherton	1815–1897	July 24, 1844	1 adopted child
Mary Wood	1818–1898	September 9, 1844	4 children including Helaman Pratt
Hannahette Snively	1812–1898	November 2, 1844	3 children
Belinda Marden	1820–1894	November 20, 1844	5 children
Sarah Houston	1822–1886	October 15, 1844	4 children
Phoebe Elizabeth Soper	1823–1887	February 8, 1846	3 children
Ann Agatha Walker	1829–1908	April 28, 1847	5 children

Agatha ran a millinery business in Salt Lake City.

Other wives of Pratt:

- Martha Monks (1825–?). Married Pratt April 28, 1847. One child died shortly after birth. After this Martha abandoned Pratt in early 1849 and moved to California.
- Keziah Downes (1812–1876). Married Pratt on December 27, 1853. They did not have any children. She lived in the same house as five of Pratt's other wives and helped them in raising their children.
- Eleanor Jane McComb (1817–1874). Married Pratt on November 14, 1855.

Pratt's constant missions left him little time with his family. After he started practicing plural marriage, the longest period of time he had with his family were the 18 months following his return from a mission to Chile.

According to Terryl L. Givens and Matthew J. Grow, Pratt's "highest happiness was to be surrounded by a teeming domestic world of multiple wives and offspring." They noted that he also had an "antisocial bent".

One of Pratt's grandsons, William King Driggs, was the father of the King Sisters.

Mitt Romney, the Massachusetts governor (2003–07) and the 2012 Republican nominee for the U.S. presidency, is one of Pratt's great-great-grandsons.

One of Pratt's great-great-great-grandsons is Jon Huntsman, the former Utah governor and Ambassador to China, and an unsuccessful candidate for the 2012 Republican presidential nomination.

Outside of politics, he was the great-great-grandfather of animator Don Bluth, as well as his brother Toby Bluth.

== Memorials ==
- Pratt explored, surveyed, and built the first public road in Parley's Canyon, Salt Lake City, which is named in his honor.
- His escape from the Columbia Jail on July 4, 1839, has been commemorated in Columbia, Missouri, with a "freedom run" each Independence Day since 1983.

== Publications ==
- A Voice of Warning (1837) (eBook from Project Gutenberg)
- Mormonism unveiled: Zion's watchman unmasked, and its editor, Mr. L.R. Sunderland, exposed : truth vindicated : the devil mad, and priestcraft in danger! (1838) (scans from Church History Library at Archive.org)
- The Millennium and Other Poems (1840) (scans from BYU library)
- Late Persecutions of the Church of Jesus Christ of Latter-day Saints: With a Sketch of Their Rise, Progress and Doctrine (1840) (scans from BYU library)
- "A Dialogue between Joseph Smith and the Devil", 1844
- Key to the Science of Theology (1855) (eBook from Project Gutenberg)
- Key to the Science of Theology (1855) (scans from BYU library)
- The Autobiography of Parley Parker Pratt (1874, posthumous) (scans from BYU library)
- The Autobiography of Parley Parker Pratt (eBook from Project Gutenberg of 1888 edition)

== See also ==
- LDS fiction
- Latter Day Saint martyrs
- The Church of Jesus Christ of Latter-day Saints in Arkansas
- "The Morning Breaks, the Shadows Flee"

== Notes ==
The Church of Jesus Christ of Latter-day Saints titles
Preceded by William E. M'Lellin	Quorum of the Twelve Apostles; February 21, 1835 – May 13, 1857	Succeeded by Luke S. Johnson
