= Senator Adams =

Senator Adams may refer to:

- Alonzo W. Adams (1820–1887), California state senator
- Alva B. Adams (1875–1941), United States Senator from Colorado from 1923 until 1924 and again from 1933 to 1941
- Benjamin Adams (politician) (1764–1837), Massachusetts State Senate
- Billy Adams (politician) (1861–1954), Colorado State Senate
- Brock Adams (1927–2004), Washington State Senate
- Charles Bayley Adams (1887–1961), President of the Vermont State State Senate
- Charles Edward Adams (politician) (1867–1936), Minnesota State Senate
- Charles Francis Adams Sr. (1807–1886), Massachusetts State State Senate
- Charles H. Adams (New York politician) (1824–1902), New York State Senate
- Daniel Adams (physician) (1773–1864), Massachusetts State Senate
- Ernest Adams (politician) (1896–1976), Nebraska State Senate
- Eric Adams (politician) (born 1960), New York State Senate
- George E. Adams (1840–1917), Illinois State Senate
- George H. Adams (1851–1911), President of the New Hampshire State Senate
- Greg L. Adams (born 1952)
- Henry Adams (Wisconsin politician) (1811–1871), Wisconsin State State Senate
- Isaac Adams (inventor) (1802–1883), Massachusetts State Senate
- J. Stuart Adams, Utah State State Senate
- James Hopkins Adams (1812–1861), South Carolina State Senate
- John Q. Adams (Wisconsin politician) (1816–1895), Wisconsin State State Senate
- John Quincy Adams (1767–1848), Massachusetts
- John Turvill Adams (1805–1882), Connecticut State Senate
- John Adams (Wisconsin politician, born 1819) (1819–1908), Wisconsin State State Senate
- John Adams Sr. (Nebraska politician) (1876–1962), Nebraska Legislature
- John Adams Jr. (Nebraska politician) (1906–1999), Nebraska Legislature
- Judith Adams (1943–2012), Australian Senate
- Julie Raque Adams (born 1969), Kentucky State Senate
- Levi Adams (1762–1831), New York State Senate
- Platt Adams (politician) (1792–1887), New York State Senate
- Robert H. Adams (1792–1830), briefly a member of the United States State Senate for Mississippi
- Robert Adams Jr. (1849–1906), Pennsylvania State Senate
- Samuel Adams (Arkansas politician) (1805–1850), Arkansas State Senate
- Samuel Adams (1722–1803), Massachusetts State Senate
- Sebastian C. Adams (1825–1898), Oregon State Senate
- Stephen Adams (politician) (1807–1857), United States Senator from Mississippi
- Thomas Burton Adams Jr. (1917–2006), Florida State Senate from 1956 to 1960
- Thomas H. Adams (1904–1957), Nebraska State Senate
- Thurman Adams Jr. (1928–2009), Delaware State Senate
- William E. Adams (New York politician) (1922–1983), New York State Senate

== See also ==
- John H. Addams (1822–1881), Illinois State Senate
