= Gordon Ogden =

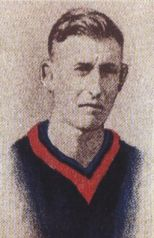

Personal information
- Full name: Gordon Francis Ogden
- Born: 14 February 1909; Northcote, Victoria
- Died: 23 August 2001 (aged 92)
- Original team: Northcote CYMS (CYMSFA)
- Height: 177 cm (5 ft 10 in)
- Weight: 69 kg (152 lb)
- Position: Back pocket

Playing career^{1}
Years	Club	Games (Goals)
1928–1937	Melbourne	134 (3)
- ^{1} Playing statistics correct to the end of 1937.

Gordon Ogden (14 February 1909 – 23 August 2001) was a professional athlete and an Australian rules footballer who played for Melbourne in the Victorian Football League (VFL).

== Family ==
The son of dual Essendon premiership player and coach Percival Gordon Ogden (1886-1967), and Mary Kathleen Ogden (1886-1963), née Gaynor, Gordon Francis Ogden was born in Northcote, Victoria on 14 February 1909. His brother, Terence William John Ogden (1911-1935) played VFL football for both Melbourne and Carlton.

He married Patricia deVere Kelly (1911-1958) on 4 June 1934 at Clifton Hill. They had four daughters.

== Athlete ==
A talented professional sprinter, Ogden won the 1936 Nyah Gift.

== Footballer ==
Ogden was recruited from CYMS Football Association club Northcote CYMS. He played at Melbourne as a back pocket specialist and represented the VFL five times during his career.

After appearing in losing Preliminary Finals at the end of the 1936 and 1937 seasons, Ogden left Melbourne. He initially signed a deal to be playing coach of Victorian Football Association club Brighton in 1938, but instead went to country club Warracknabeal after receiving a better offer. The following year, he signed as captain-coach of VFA club Williamstown, at the time a financially troubled club that had been very weak on-field. Although 'Town had won only twice in 1938, Ogden steered them to a flag in 1939 and captain-coached Williamstown from 1939 to 1941, although he missed half of the latter season due to injuries, illness, business commitments and a two-match suspension. He captain-coached Williamstown Seconds in 1944 when that competition resumed after the war recess and also played a further 7 senior games in 1945 to finish up with 56 appearances and one goal.

In 1947 Ogden joined the VFL senior list of umpires, umpired 14 VCFL matches and was emergency field umpire for a single VFL match. He returned as a non-playing coach of Williamstown in 1948, serving two seasons and leading the club to another premiership in 1949 with a 3-point victory over Oakleigh in Ron Todd's last appearance for the Seagulls.

He was overlooked for the coaching position in 1950 and eventually ended up coaching Yarraville from 1951-55. The Eagles had been last in the previous three seasons, but under Ogden they developed so well as to reach a Grand Final in 1953, only to be thrashed by ten goals against a powerful Port Melbourne combination. For the following season it was generally thought Yarraville's prospects were extremely good, but apart from a five-game winning streak mid-season the Eagles were extremely disappointing in 1954, and 1955 was no different. Ogden planned to retire from coaching the Eagles at the end of that season, and did not change his mind although the Yarraville committee attempted to re-appoint him for 1956.

Ogden returned to Melbourne, and served as assistant coach to Norm Smith from 1962 until the end of the 1965 VFL season; and, also, served as coach of the Melbourne Reserves from 1963 to 1965.

== Recognition ==
In 2014 he was one of 51 former players, officials and volunteers who were announced as inaugural inductees into the Williamstown Football Club's Hall of Fame.
