= Henry Kosman =

American politician (1913–1984)

Member of the Nebraska Legislature from the 10th district
- In office January 7, 1947 – January 10, 1949
- Preceded by: Clifford Ogden
- Succeeded by: Clifford Ogden

Personal details
- Born: May 13, 1913 Omaha, Nebraska
- Died: February 12, 1984 (aged 70) Denver, Colorado
- Party: Republican
- Spouse: Jane Ostenberg (m. 1941)
- Children: 3 (Ann, Dianna, Henry)
- Education: University of Nebraska
- Occupation: Banker

Military service
- Allegiance: United States
- Branch/service: United States Army Corps of Engineers

Henry D. Kosman (May 13, 1913 – February 12, 1984) was a Republican politician from Nebraska who served as a member of the Nebraska Legislature from the 10th district from 1947 to 1949.

== Early life ==
Kosman was born in Omaha, Nebraska, in 1913. He graduated from Benson High School, and then attended the University of Nebraska, graduating in 1935. Kosman served in the U.S. Army Corps of Engineers during World War II, eventually becoming a lieutenant colonel. Upon returning to Nebraska, he worked for the Western Insurance Company for six years and then opened his own firm, the H. D. Kosman Company, which provided insurance and surety bonds.

== Nebraska Legislature ==
In 1946, Kosman ran to succeed retiring State Senator Clifford Ogden from the Omaha-based 10th district. He faced former State Senator Charles Crowley; Anton Munch, a railroad employee; advertising consultant Edward Skogman; and bar owner George Cornwell in the primary election. Kosman placed first, winning 33 percent of the vote to Cornwell's 23 percent, and they advanced to the general election. In the general election, Kosman defeated Cornwell in a landslide, winning 61 percent of the vote to his 39 percent.

Kosman ran for re-election to a second term in 1948, and was challenged by Mildred Woods, a member of the Omaha School Board. Kosman placed first in the primary by a wide margin, winning 67 percent of the vote to Woods's 33 percent. On September 27, 1948, Woods withdrew from the race following her relocation to Wisconsin, and Kosman was unopposed for re-election.

Several days into Kosman's second term in the legislature, he announced that he had accepted a position at the Scottsbluff National Bank, and would resign from the legislature, effective January 10, 1949. Governor Val Peterson appointed Ogden as his successor.

== Post-legislative career ==
Following his resignation from the legislature, Kosman relocated to Scottsbluff. He became the president of the Scottsbluff National Bank in 1951. In 1961, he was appointed to the board of directors of the Omaha Branch of the Federal Reserve Bank of Kansas City, and he served until 1967, when he was term-limited.

In 1968, Kosman ran to be a delegate to the Scotts Bluff County Republican Convention. Later that year, Governor Norbert Tiemann appointed Kosman to the board of directors of the Consumers Public Power District. The Consumers Public Power District merged with several other districts to form the Nebraska Public Power District in 1970, and Kosman was elected the second vice president of the newly formed board. Kosman was elected to a full six-year term on the board in 1970 unopposed, and was re-elected without opposition in 1976 and 1982.

== Death ==
Kosman died on February 12, 1984.
