= Senator Ogden =

Senator Ogden may refer to:

- Aaron Ogden (1756–1839), New Jersey State Senate
- Clifford Ogden (1901–1968), Nebraska State Senate
- Steve Ogden (born 1950), Texas State Senate
- William B. Ogden (1805–1877), Illinois State Senate
