= 1866 Texas lieutenant gubernatorial election =

- June 25, 1866
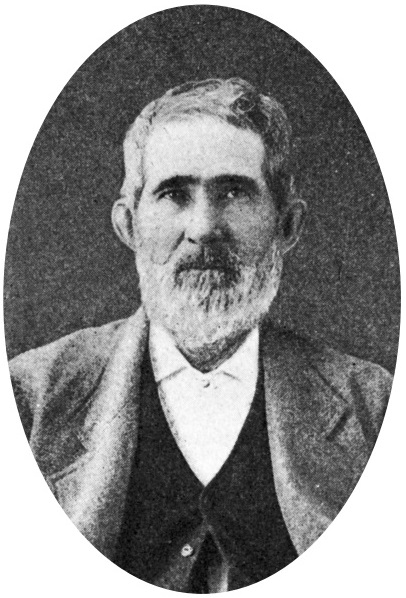

| Nominee | George Washington Jones | Livingston Lindsay |
| Party | Democratic | Republican |
| Popular vote | 48,908 | 8,714 |
| Percentage | 84.27% | 15.02% |
Lieutenant Governor before election
Vacant
Elected Lieutenant Governor
George Washington Jones
Democratic

The 1866 Texas lieutenant gubernatorial election was held on June 25, 1866, in order to elect the lieutenant governor of Texas. Democratic candidate George Washington Jones defeated Republican candidate Livingston Lindsay by an overwhelming margin.

== General election ==
This was the first statewide election in Texas following the end of the American Civil War. Members of the Confederate administration of the state had either fled to Mexico or had been removed from office by military officials and replaced by some, like Andrew Hamilton, to lead the state on an interim basis. The election was held concurrently with a vote on the ratification of the newly drafted state Constitution of 1866. The document abolished slavery in the state as was a condition of readmittance to the Union and protected their property and legal rights, but still barred freedmen from participation in the political sphere. The document also lengthened the term of the governor and lieutenant governor from two years to four years.

=== Candidates ===
- George Washington Jones, delegate at the 1866 constitutional convention, Lieutenant Colonel in the 17th Texas Infantry, former district attorney of Bastrop County (Democrat)
- Livingston Lindsay, lawyer from La Grange (Republican)
- Benjamin Holland Epperson, president of the Memphis, El Paso and Pacific Railroad, candidate for the United States Senate in 1866, candidate for governor in 1851, former state representative (Republican) (withdrawn)

=== Results ===
Texas lieutenant gubernatorial election, 1866
| Party | Candidate | Votes | % |
|---|---|---|---|
| Democratic | George W. Jones | 48,908 | 84.27 |
| Republican | Livingston Lindsay | 8,714 | 15.02 |
| Write-in | | 413 | 0.72 |
| Total votes | | 58,035 | 100.00 |
| Democratic hold | | | |

== Aftermath ==
While the Constitution of 1866 was adopted by the people by a vote of 28,119 to 23,400, Congress did not approve of the document as Radical Republicans did not believe the document went far enough with incorporating and expanding the rights of freedmen. In 1867, the southern states would be placed under martial law in the form of five military districts. A few months later, the military governor of the 5th district, General Philip H. Sheridan removed Governor James W. Throckmorton and Lieutenant Governor Jones from office for being an "impediment to reconstruction".

While the military restructuring resulted in the losing candidate in the 1866 gubernatorial election being appointed to the position, the same was not true for the lieutenant governor as Livingston Lindsay was appointed to a seat on the Supreme Court of Texas instead.
