= A Dialogue Between Joseph Smith and the Devil =

Short story

"A Dialogue between Joseph Smith and the Devil" (or "Joe Smith and the Devil") is an 1844 short story by Parley P. Pratt, generally credited as the first work of Mormon fiction. A piece of closet drama or, more precisely, a dialogue, "Dialogue" begins with the devil putting up handbills:

All the liars, swindlers, thieves, robbers, incendiaries, murderers, cheats, adulterers, harlots, blackguards, gamblers, bogus makers, idlers, busy bodies, pickpockets, vagabonds, filthy persons, and all other infidels and rebellious, disorderly persons, for a crusade against Joe Smith and the Mormons! Be quick, be quick, I say or our cause will be ruined and our kingdom overthrown by the d----d fool of an imposter and his associates, for even now all earth and hell is in a stew.

They engage in a conversation which manages wit while still engaging in Pratt's proselytory purposes. The two part on friendly terms:

Devil: (Holding up glass) Come, Mr. Smith, your good health. I propose we offer a toast.

Smith: Well proceed.

Devil: Here's to my good friend, Joe Smith, may all sorts of ill-luck befall him, and may he never be suffered to enter my kingdom, either in time or eternity, for he would almost make me forget that I am a devil, and make a gentleman of me, while he gently overthrows my government at the same time that he wins my friendship.

Smith: Here to his Satanic Majesty; may he be driven from the earth and be forced to put to sea in a stone canoe with an iron paddle, and may the canoe sink, and a shark swallow the canoe and its royal freight and an alligator swallow the shark and may the alligator be bound in the northwest corner of hell, the door be locked, key lost, and a blind man hunting for it.

The story first appeared on the front page of the New York Herald, August 25, 1844.

== Notes ==
1.The date is frequently erroneously cited as January 1, 1844, but the August date is correct.
