= Livingston Lindsay =

American judge (1806–1892)

Livingston Lindsay (October 16, 1806 – 1892) was a justice of the Supreme Court of Texas from September 1867 to July 1870.

Lindsay was born in Orange County, Virginia. He attended the University of Virginia and moved to Hopkinsville, Kentucky after graduating. He was admitted to the state bar after reading the law and taught school in Princeton, Kentucky. In 1860, Lindsay moved to La Grange, Texas where he continued his law practice. He was a candidate for Lieutenant Governor in 1866, but lost to George Washington Jones. When Texas was placed under military reconstruction in 1867, Lindsay was appointed to the Supreme Court of Texas in order to replace those who were seen as an impediment to Reconstruction. He served as a delegate to the state Constitutional Convention in 1868, and left the Court following its restructuring when the new constitution was adopted in 1869. He would go on to serve in various county level judicial roles until his death in 1892.

Political offices
Preceded by Newly constituted court	Justice of the Texas Supreme Court; 1867–1870	Succeeded by Wesley Ogden
