= John Stone (footballer) =

English footballer

Personal information
- Full name: John George Stone
- Date of birth: 3 March 1953 (age 73)
- Place of birth: Carlin How, England
- Height: 6 ft 0 in (1.83 m)
- Position: Defender

Senior career*
| Years | Team | Apps | (Gls) |
| –1970 | South Bank | | |
| 1970–1972 | Middlesbrough | 2 | (0) |
| 1972–1976 | York City | 86 | (5) |
| 1976–1979 | Darlington | 120 | (14) |
| 1979–1983 | Grimsby Town | 94 | (2) |
| 1983–1984 | Rotherham United | 10 | (1) |
| Total | | 312 | (22) |
- * Club domestic league appearances and goals

John George Stone (born 3 March 1953) is an English former professional footballer who played as a defender. He played for South Bank, Middlesbrough, York City, Darlington, Grimsby Town and Rotherham United.

== Career ==
Stone was born in Carlin How, North Riding of Yorkshire. He played for South Bank before signing for Second Division club Middlesbrough in July 1970. He started his time at Middlesbrough playing in their juniors as a centre forward and was top scorer in the 1970–71 Northern Intermediate League.

After making two league appearances for Middlesbrough in the 1971–72 season, Stone signed for Third Division club York City in July 1972. He made his debut after starting a 1–0 defeat away to Tranmere Rovers on 15 September in York's seventh league match of 1972–73, replacing John Mackin at right back. He finished the season with 34 appearances and five goals for York in all competitions. He spent the season primarily at right back, but played as a striker towards the end of the season, scoring two goals from five matches in this position. In 1973–74, Stone missed three matches, making 51 appearances in all competitions as York finished third in the Third Division, thus winning promotion to the Second Division for the first time in the club's history. An injury sustained in York's 1–0 defeat away to Sunderland on 14 September 1974 resulted in him missing the rest of 1974–75, which he finished with six appearances in all competitions.

Having again been restricted to six appearances in all competitions for York in 1975–76, Stone signed for Fourth Division club Darlington in July 1976. He moved to Darlington in search of a fresh start, which he achieved with great success, making 120 league appearances and scoring 14 goals for the club. Stone left Darlington three years later to sign for Third Division club Grimsby Town for a £22,500 fee in July 1979. He helped Grimsby win the Third Division title, and thus promotion to the Second Division, in 1979–80. Stone finished his Grimsby career with 94 league appearances and two goals, before signing for Rotherham United of the Third Division in September 1983. He retired from football following his spell with Rotherham, for whom he made ten league appearances and scored one goal in 1983–84.

== Style of play ==
Stone was a "polished" right back who was noted for his retention of the ball.

== Honours ==
York City

- Football League Third Division third-place promotion: 1973–74

Grimsby Town

- Football League Third Division: 1979–80
