= Mary Ann Pratt =

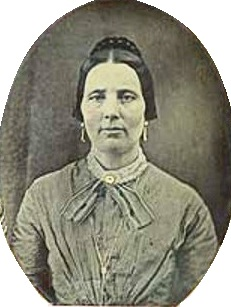

Personal details
- Born: Mary Ann Frost; January 14, 1809; Groton, Vermont, United States
- Died: August 24, 1891 (aged 82); Pleasant Grove, Utah, Utah Territory, United States
- Resting place: Pleasant Grove City Cemetery; 40.3691°N 111.7409°W
- Spouse(s): Nathan Stearns (m. 1832; died 1833) Parley P. Pratt (m. 1837; div. 1853)
- Children: 5

Mary Ann Pratt ( (née Frost; January 14, 1809 – August 24, 1891) was a midwife and early member of the Latter Day Saint movement who was the second wife of Parley P. Pratt, one of the original twelve apostles of the Church of Jesus Christ of Latter Day Saints. She accompanied Parley P. Pratt on several missions, including one to Europe and was instrumental in publishing his writings and poems. Mary Ann joined with the church and followed Brigham Young to Utah with the Mormon pioneers, arriving in Utah Territory in 1852. She is also considered by some to have been one of the plural wives of Joseph Smith the founder of the Latter Day Saint movement. Her life paralleled much of the early history of the church.

== Early life ==
Mary Ann Frost was born in Groton, Vermont, and was the daughter of Aaron Frost, a farmer, and his wife Susanna Gray Bennett Frost. Their first children were born in Berwick, Maine, where Aaron's family lived. They later moved to North Yarmouth, Maine, where Susan's family lived and three more siblings were born. After the birth of Mary Ann and two more siblings in Groton, the family moved to Bethel, Maine (then a province of Massachusetts). There, Mary Ann's four last siblings were born.

She married Nathan Stearns, her first husband, on April 1, 1832. She gave birth to her first child, Mary Ann Stearns, on April 6, 1833. Nathan Stearns died of typhoid fever on August 25 of the same year leaving Mary Ann, who also had contracted the illness, a widow with a four-month-old daughter.

== Conversion to mormonism ==
Patty Bartlett Sessions, one of the relatives of Mary Ann's husband Nathan Stearns, and her husband were baptized by missionaries in Maine in 1834. Her uncle Orange C. Frost brought news of the missionaries to Mary Ann's mother although never joined the church to appease the criticisms from his immediate family. In the late summer of 1835 Brigham Young, and a number of other Mormon missionaries preached for a week in Bethel, Maine, where Mary Ann converted to the faith and was baptized by Mormon Apostle David W. Patten. Mary Ann's mother and grandmother Frost were also baptized by Patten at that time. The teaching of the church of the redemption of the dead was pivotal in the conversion of Mary Ann and her family. Mary Ann's father, grandfather and her sister Olive Grey Frost – who would later marry both Joseph Smith and, after Smith's death, Brigham Young – were baptized shortly afterwards by John Pack. In 1836, following preaching by apostles of the Church now in Kirtland, Ohio, convinced Sessions and her husband to move to Kirtland. Mary Ann followed Sessions and arrived in Kirtland in August 1836.

== Marriage to Parley P. Pratt ==
Mary Ann met Parley P. Pratt in Saco, Maine, during a conference of the young church. In late 1836 Mary Ann and her sister moved to Kirtland, Ohio, where the church gathered and built its first temple. While in Kirtland, Mary Ann met with recently widowed Parley P. Pratt, one of the original twelve apostles of the Church of Jesus Christ of Latter Day Saints. Pratt had just returned from a mission in Canada, perhaps planning on courting Mary Ann upon his return. They were married in Kirtland on May 9, 1837, by Frederick G. Williams in the house of Hyrum Smith. Joseph Smith opposed a speedy wedding of Pratt and other widows so shortly after the death of their prior spouse. In July Parley P. Pratt left on a mission trip to New York City. During this trip Pratt published the second edition of The Book of Mormon and his book A Voice of Warning defending the new restorationist faith.

In April 1838, as a result of church members being expelled from Ohio, Pratt and Mary Ann moved to the town of Far West in Caldwell County, Missouri. Their first child, Nathan Pratt, was born there on August 31, 1838. On October 30, her husband was arrested by the Missouri Militia and imprisoned for 8 months in Independence and then Richmond, Missouri. Parley P. Pratt had participated in the Battle of Crooked River, near Ray County, Missouri, on 25 October 1838. For his role in the battle, he was apprehended and was jailed at Richmond in Ray County and later in Columbia in Boone County from late 1838. In December Mary Ann joined her husband in jail along with her two children until March 17, 1839, when she joined other Mormons in Far West, Missouri, before moving to Quincy, Illinois. On July 4, 1839, Pratt escaped from jail and reunited with Mary Ann and her children at Quincy on July 11. During a second imprisonment, Mary Ann didn't join Parley in prison during which time she was instrumental in publishing Parley's writings and poems.

On August 29, 1839, Mary Ann and Pratt left for New York City before going to England on a mission trip. Pratt sailed from New York on March 9, 1840, and arrived in Liverpool. Mary returned to her parents in Maine for a few months and arrived in Manchester, England, in mid-October, 1840. Their daughter Olivia Pratt was born in Manchester, England on June 2, 1841. They left England with 250 converts on October 29, 1842, and arrived in Nauvoo, Illinois, the new headquarters of the church, on April 12, 1843.

== Children ==
Mary Ann Pratt had one daughter, Mary Ann Stearns, with her first husband. She was given a small amount of money on behalf of her daughter after the death of her husband. Mary Ann left Maine to Kirtland with her daughter to join the main congregations of The Church of Jesus Christ of Latter-day Saints founded by Smith. After their marriage, Parley P. Pratt left his son at the care of a nanny for about a year. Marry Ann then moved to Missouri with Parley, her daughter and his son where she raised him since. Together Mary Ann and Parley had a son, Nathan, named after her first husband Nathan Stearns. Their second child, Olivia Thankful Pratt, was born in England and named after Parley P. Pratt's first wife Thankful. Their third child, a daughter Susan, was born on board the “Maid of Iowa” on the family's return to the United States. Both Nathan and Susan died shortly after arriving in Nauvoo. The fourth child of the couple was born in Nauvoo, named Moroni Llewellyn Pratt. Mary Ann along with her daughters Mary Ann, Olivia and her daughter Moroni L. moved to Salt Lake City in 1852.

== Polygamy ==
Joseph Smith taught the principle of plural marriages to Parley P. Pratt and his right to take additional wives in 1843. Mary Ann was opposed to the doctrine and may have conferred her opposition to Parley. She also consulted with other women, especially Vilate, the wife of prominent church apostle Heber C. Kimball. Between 1843 and 1844, Mary Ann and Parley were favorably close to each other, the time frame when Pratt brought to the family three plural wivesː Elizabeth Brotherton who also initially opposed the practice, Mary Wood, and Hannahett Snively. On December 10, 1845, Mary Ann, along with Parley P. Pratt and his brother Orson Pratt, received the temple endowment in the Nauvoo Temple.

It is supposed by some that Mary Ann became a plural wife of Joseph Smith in 1843. However, there is no documentary evidence to support this claim. In the summer of 1843, Mary Ann's sister, Olive Grey Frost (1816–1845), was married to Joseph Smith. On November 7, 1844, Mary Ann's sister Olive Frost was married to Brigham Young as his 16th wife. She died in Nauvoo on October 6, 1845.

Sometime after January 1, 1846, Mary Ann found out about Pratt's polygamous marriages, which dated back to 1844. The couple estranged after this. On February 6, 1846, following the advice of Brigham Young, Mary Ann was sealed, by Apostle Heber C. Kimball, to Pratt for time and was sealed to Joseph Smith for eternity in the Nauvoo Temple. (Note that Smith had been dead for a year and a half at that time.) At that same time, Mary Ann served as proxy for the sealing of deceased Thankful to Parley for eternity.

== Later life ==
On February 13, 1846, Mary Ann, Parley and children left Nauvoo with the bulk of the Mormons living there. Mary Ann returned one week later to stay with her parents, who were still in Nauvoo but planned to leave when work on the Temple was complete.

On September 18, 1846, Mary Ann left Nauvoo with the last group of Mormons and arrived, in June 1847, at Winter Quarters, Nebraska. Upon rejoining Parley she told him she is returning to Maine with the children. This was, apparently, the last time the two were together. Parley left on a mission trip in late 1847. In March 1848 Mary received from Parley about $200 from the proceeds from the sale of their house in Nauvoo and returned to Maine.

After living in Bethel for about three years, Mary Ann left on March 10, 1851, and stayed for some time in St. Louis, Missouri, and Kanesville, Iowa. She and her three surviving children left Kanesville on June 10, 1852, and arrived in Salt Lake City, Utah, with the Harmon Cutler Company on September 10, 1852. Pratt returned from an eighteen-month mission trip to California and Chile on October 18. Mary Ann did not reunite with him but allowed their children to visit him. On March 5, 1853, she was granted a divorce from Parley P. Pratt by Brigham Young.

Mary Ann lived the rest of her life in Pleasant Grove, Utah. She never remarried. She worked as a midwife and is reputed to have delivered hundreds of children without losing a single one.

In 1880 Mary Ann authored an article in the Salt Lake City magazine Woman's Exponent entitled "Give to those Rights to Whom Rights Belong", which advocated that women be given more legal and political rights. Her authorship of this article can be interpreted as placing her among the earliest of American feminists.

Mary Ann died in Pleasant Grove in 1891, at the age of 83. She was buried in the Pleasant Grove City Cemetery.

== Children ==
Mary Ann Frost Stearns Pratt was the mother of five children by her two husbands. Two of the children died while young.

Child with Nathan Stearns –

- Mary Ann Stearns (April 6, 1833 – April 4, 1912) m. Oscar Winters (1825–1903)

Children with Parley Pratt –

- Nathan Pratt (August 31, 1838 – December 12, 1843)
- Olivia Thankful Pratt (June 2, 1841 – June 12, 1906) m. Benjamin Woodbury Driggs (1837–1913)
- Susan Pratt (April 7, 1843 – August 1844)
- Moroni Llewellyn Pratt (December 7, 1844 – April 18, 1913) m. Caroline M. Bebee (1852–1913)

Rumors that alleged that Moroni L Pratt was a child of Joseph Smith were disproven by DNA technology.

== See also ==
- Parley Pratt
- Wives of Joseph Smith
