= John B. Ogden =

American lawyer

- Born: July 3, 1812; Cumberland County, New Jersey, U.S.
- Died: Unknown
- Occupation: Judge

John B. Ogden (July 3, 1812 in Cumberland County, New Jersey - after 1889 probably Crawford County, Arkansas) was an Arkansas judge.

== Early life ==
John B. Ogden was the son of Col John B. Ogden and Sarah Buck. His father died in 1813 from the effects of a wound received during the War of 1812. His mother Sarah (Buck) Ogden died in 1873. John B. Ogden was an only child. At 17 years old, he began the study of law.

== Career ==
In 1843, he came to Van Buren, Crawford County, Arkansas where he lived the rest of his life. In 1856, he was made a United States Commissioner of the District Court, Western District of Arkansas, which also included all of the district of the Indian Territory (now Oklahoma), an office he held until after the Civil War.

He was the judge who presided over the evidentiary hearing against Parley P. Pratt, the famous Mormon apostle, on 12 May 1857, and acquitted him. A short time after his release, Parley was murdered by Hector McLean, James Cornell and Amasa Howell in front of the Winn farm near Alma, Crawford Co, Arkansas.

In 1866, John B. Ogden was appointed Assistant United States District Attorney for the Western District of the State (of Arkansas) and held that position until 1871 or 1872.

== Personal life ==
In 1835, he married (probably in Louisville, Kentucky) to Jane Sibley (1817–1866), daughter of Gen. John Sibley of New Jersey.

In 1868, he married Mrs. Susan H Wing (née Barron) of Saint Charles, Missouri.

John B. Ogden, Lawyer, was alive in 1889 living in Van Buren, Crawford Co, Arkansas at the time Goodspeed made his famous biographies of that area.
