= Ogden, Missouri =

Extinct hamlet in Missouri, U.S.

Coordinates: 36°44′40″N 89°33′23″W

Ogden is an extinct town in New Madrid County, in the U.S. state of Missouri. The GNIS classifies it as a populated place.

A post office called Ogden was established in 1826, and remained in operation until 1893. The community has the name of the local Ogden family of pioneer citizens.
