= Lucy Walker (composer) =

Romanian composer, pianist and professor

- Born: 1998 (age 27–28); North East England
- Education: Gonville and Caius College, Cambridge
- Occupations: Composer; Academic teacher
- Organizations: University of Cambridge

Lucy Helen Walker (born 1998) is an English composer and music educator. She is known for her choral compositions.

== Life and career ==
Born in North East England in 1998, Walker studied at the Gonville and Caius College, Cambridge, where she graduated in 2020, with the Sir Rudolph Peters Prize for Excellence in Music; she also earned the 2021 Graduate Prize for Music.

She became composer-in-residence with St Martin's Voices, the vocal consort at St-Martin-in-the-Fields. They made a recording of her compositions in 2025, conducted by Stephen Farr and Andrew Earis. From 2025 to 2028, she has shared the association with the ensemble with Bob Chilcott. She has received commissions from the BBC Singers, The Sixteen, Voces8, English cathedral choirs and the choir of Pembroke College, Cambridge. Her works have been recorded and broadcast.

She has taught musical analysis, music theory and harmony to undergraduate students at the University of Cambridge.

== Works ==
Walker composed for St Martin's Voices:

- Three Carols: "The Christmas Life", "We shall walk", "The Angels' Song"
- I saw Eternity
- Here, home
- All things are changed
- St Martin's Service
- The Kingdom of Heaven
- Compline

Several of her works for four-part mixed choirs were published by Boosey & Hawkes:

- A Hymn for St Cecilia
- Ave virgo canctissima
- Away in a manger
- Bird Raptures, three works
- I saw Eternity
- Love Flows
- Make me an island
- My heart, O God
- O nata lux
- O Sing to the Lord
- The Angel's Song
- The Christmas Life
- There will come soft rains
- Today
- We shall walk
