= Ogden, West Virginia =

Ogden
- Unincorporated community
- Location within the state of West Virginia Ogden (the United States)
- Coordinates: 39°18′6″N 81°24′7″W
- Country: United States
- State: West Virginia
- County: Wood
- Elevation: 709 ft (216 m)
- Time zone: UTC-5 (Eastern (EST))
  - Summer (DST): UTC-4 (EDT)
- GNIS ID: 1552369

Ogden is an unincorporated community in Wood County, West Virginia, United States.
