= Ian Robb (footballer) =

English footballer (born 1955)

Personal information
- Full name: Ian Alexander Robb
- Date of birth: 1 June 1955 (age 71)
- Place of birth: Doncaster, West Riding of Yorkshire, England
- Height: 6 ft 2 in (1.88 m)
- Position: Defender

Youth career
- Liverpool

Senior career*
Years	Team	Apps	(Gls)
1971–1976	York City	4	(0)
- Frickley Athletic
- Selby Town
- Olympia Station
- Selby Town
Total		4	(0)
- * Club domestic league appearances and goals

Ian Alexander Robb (born 1 June 1955) is an English former professional footballer who played as a defender in the Football League for York City, in non-League football for Frickley Athletic, Selby Town and Olympia Station, and was on the books of Liverpool without making a league appearance.
