= Ernest Adams (politician) =

American politician (1896–1976)

Douglas County Treasurer
- In office January 8, 1943 – January 4, 1951
- Preceded by: Otto Bauman
- Succeeded by: Carl W. Jensen

Member of the Nebraska Legislature from the 10th district
- In office January 5, 1937 – January 5, 1943
- Preceded by: Position created
- Succeeded by: Clifford Ogden

Personal details
- Born: December 17, 1896 Omaha, Nebraska
- Died: March 12, 1976 (aged 79) Tallahassee, Florida
- Party: Republican
- Spouse: Vera Christensen (m. 1928)
- Children: 1
- Education: Omaha Municipal University; Omaha College of Law
- Occupation: Athletic coach, insurance salesman

Military service
- Allegiance: United States
- Branch/service: United States Army
- Unit: Signal Corps

Ernest "Ernie" Arthur Adams (December 17, 1896 – March 12, 1976) was a Republican politician from Nebraska who served as a member of the Nebraska Legislature from the 10th district from 1937 to 1943 and as Douglas County Treasurer from 1943 to 1951.

== Early life ==
Adams was born in Omaha, Nebraska, in 1896. He graduated from grade school in Omaha, and served in the Signal Corps during World War I. Adams played baseball while in the U.S. Army, and when he attended Omaha Municipal University, he was a player-coach on the team. He later attended the Omaha College of Law and coached at Benson High School.

== Nebraska Legislature ==
In 1936, Adams ran for the newly created 10th district in the unicameral Nebraska Legislature. He faced ten opponents in the nonpartisan primary, and placed second, advancing to the general election with Frank Sanderholm. Adams defeated Sanderholm with 57 percent of the vote.

Adams ran for re-election in 1938, and was challenged by former State Senator Charles Crowley, attorneys Dewey Hanson and Albert Osborne, and county employee Roy Sedlacek. Adams placed first in the primary by a wide margin, and advanced to the general election with Hanson. He defeated Hanson in a landslide, winning re-election with 74 percent of the vote.

In 1940, Adams sought a third term, and was opposed by veteran and publisher Albert Osborne, and attorneys Harold Pace and George Springborg. Adams won 69 percent of the vote in the primary, and proceeded to the general election with Springborg, who placed second with 15 percent. In the general election, Adams defeated Springborg, 74–26 percent.

== Douglas County Treasurer ==
In 1940, Adams declined to seek a fourth term in the legislature and instead ran for Douglas County Treasurer. He won the Republican primary, and defeated former Election Commissioner Anton Tusa, the Democratic nominee, in the general election.

After he was elected, he had difficulty securing the bond required to take office because of outstanding obligations of his predecessor, Otto Bauman. The treasurer's office was closed while Bauman's accounts were audited, and on January 8, Adams was able to take office after securing the requisite bond.

Adams ran for re-election in 1946. He was challenged by Democrat Thomas Cronin, a local auditor and the Democratic nominee. Adams defeated Cronin in a landslide, winning 71 percent of the vote to Cronin's 29 percent.

== 1950 gubernatorial campaign ==
In 1950, rather than seek re-election, Adams announced that he would challenge incumbent Governor Val Peterson in the Republican primary. Adams attacked Peterson over his plan to build state highways with increased gasoline taxes and license fees, and won the endorsement of the Nebraska Motor Carriers Association and other groups opposed to the plan. He campaigned on reforms to the electoral process, arguing for four-year terms for the governor and two-term limits, and an abolition of the pre-primary convention nominating process. However, Peterson won renomination in a landslide, receiving 70 percent of the vote to Adams's 22 percent.

== Subsequent career ==
After leaving office, Adams announced that he would run as an independent for a third term as Douglas County Treasurer, and he narrowly placed third in the general election, winning 28 percent of the vote to Democrat Sam Howell's 38 percent and Republican Frank Heintze's 34 percent. He ran unsuccessfully for the Omaha City Council in 1957, but was elected in 1961.

== Bribery conviction ==
In 1964, Adams and two other city elected officials were indicted on charges of bribery and conspiracy to commit bribery over an alleged scheme to collect payments from Chicago investor John B. Coleman in exchange for supporting a rezoning application for a townhome development he was building. Adams declined to seek re-election in 1965 after the indictment was handed down.

On November 16, 1965, Adams was convicted of soliciting a bribe of five thousand dollars from Coleman. Adams was sentenced to two years on probation and forced to pay a $1,000 fine. He appealed his conviction, but the Nebraska Supreme Court unanimously affirmed his conviction.

Four years after his conviction, Adams successfully moved to have his conviction set aside and to have his rights restored.

== Death ==
Adams died on March 12, 1976, in Tallahassee, Florida, several years after retiring to live with his daughter.
