= Gordon Hunter (footballer, born 1954) =

English footballer

Personal information
- Full name: Gordon Greig Hunter
- Date of birth: 8 November 1954 (age 71)
- Place of birth: Lyneham, Wiltshire, England
- Height: 5 ft 7 in (1.70 m)
- Position: Defender

Senior career*
Years	Team	Apps	(Gls)
–1972	Shrewsbury Town		
1972–1978	York City	77	(1)
1978–????	Northwich Victoria		
Total		77+	(1+)
- * Club domestic league appearances and goals

Gordon Greig Hunter (born 8 November 1954) is an English former professional footballer who played as a defender in the Football League for York City, in non-League football for Northwich Victoria and was on the books of Shrewsbury Town without making a league appearance.
