= Ogden House =

Ogden House or Ogden Mansion may refer to:

in the United States (by state then city)

- David Ogden House, Fairfield, Connecticut, listed on the National Register of Historic Places (NRHP) in Fairfield County, Connecticut
- Ogden House (Council Bluffs, Iowa), formerly listed on the National Register of Historic Places listings in Pottawattamie County, Iowa
- Belcher-Ogden House, Elizabeth, New Jersey, listed on the NRHP in Union County, New Jersey
- Ogden House (Swarthmore, Pennsylvania), listed on the NRHP in Delaware County, Pennsylvania
- Dennis J. Murphy House at Ogden Farm, Middletown, Rhode Island, listed on the NRHP in Newport County, Rhode Island
- Raymond-Ogden Mansion, Seattle, Washington, listed on the National Register of Historic Places listings in King County, Washington
- H. C. Ogden House, Wheeling, West Virginia, listed on the NRHP in Ohio County, West Virginia
