= Charles Ogden =

Charles Ogden may refer to:

- Charles F. Ogden (1873–1933), American politician
- Charles Kay Ogden (1889–1957), British linguist and philosopher
- Charles Richard Ogden (1791–1866), Canadian politician
- Charles W. Ogden (1873–1956), American real estate investor and philanthropist
