= Percy Ogden =

Australian rules footballer and coach

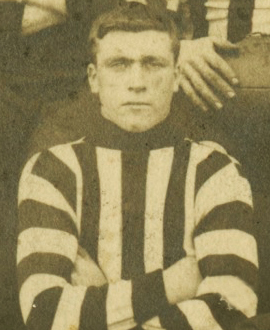
- Ogden in 1905

Personal information
- Full name: Percival Gordon Ogden
- Nickname: Butcher
- Born: 24 February 1886; Canterbury, New South Wales
- Died: 13 July 1967 (aged 81); Ivanhoe, Victoria
- Original team: Preston
- Height: 170 cm (5 ft 7 in)
- Weight: 70 kg (154 lb)

Playing career^{1}
Years	Club	Games (Goals)
1905	Collingwood	4 (0)
1910–15, 1918–21, 1920–21	Essendon	161 (91)
Total		165 (91)

Coaching career
Years	Club	Games (W–L–D)
1920–21	Essendon	20 (3–15–2)
- ^{1} Playing statistics correct to the end of 1921.

Percival Gordon Ogden (24 February 1886 – 13 July 1967) was an Australian rules footballer who played with and coached Essendon in the Victorian Football League (VFL).

== Family ==
The son of William Ogden (1852-1903), and Ellen Ogden (1864-1914), née Wilcox, later Mrs. James Taylor, Percival Gordon Ogden was born at Canterbury, New South Wales on 24 February 1886.

He married Mary Kathleen Gaynor (1886–1963), at Northcote, on 16 May 1906. They had four children; two boys and two girls. Both sons played in the VFL: Gordon Francis Ogden (1909-2001), with Melbourne, and Terence William John "Terry" Ogden (1911-1935), with Melbourne and Carlton.

== Football ==
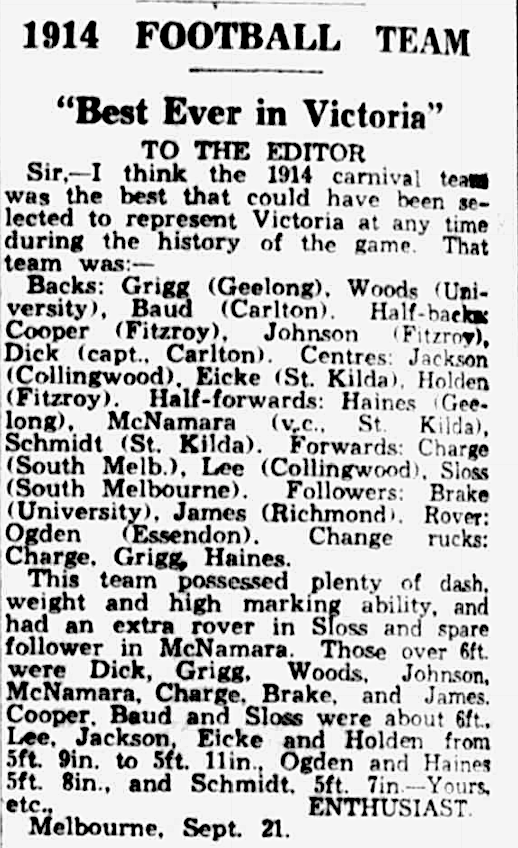
Enthusiast's Letter to the Editor The Herald, 21 September 1934.

=== Collingwood (VFL) ===
A rover, Ogden started his career with Collingwood in 1905.

=== Preston (VFA) ===
He played just four games with the club before moving to Association team Preston.

=== Essendon (VFL) ===
He returned to the VFL in 1910 with Essendon. Ogden was a member of Essendon's back-to-back premiership wins in 1911 and 1912.

=== Representative football ===
In 1907, while playing with Preston, he represented the VFA in the match against South Australia, at the East Melbourne Cricket Ground, on 8 June 1907.

While playing at Essendon he represented the VFL in 1912, and 1913, at the 1914 ANFC Carnival in Sydney, in 1919, and 1920, and at the 1921 ANFC Carnival in Perth, and was the captain of Victoria in a game against South Australia in 1920.

=== Preston ===
After Essendon disbanded during the Great War, Ogden was captain-coach of Preston (then in junior ranks) in 1916–17.

=== Essendon (VFL) ===
He returned to Essendon when it re-entered the VFL competition in 1918. He was the team's captain in 1919, and its captain-coach in 1920 and 1921.

=== Northcote (VFA) ===
Ogden retired from the VFL, and was cleared to the Northcote (he lived in Northcote) from Essendon on 10 May 1922, and was the team's captain-coach in 1922.

=== Preston ===
Believing his form was still good enough for League football, he returned to Essendon in 1923, but as a "new" player under zoning rules introduced post-war, he was residentially tied to Fitzroy and his permit was refused. Fitzroy expressed no interest in Ogden and rather than stand down for more than half a season to qualify for Essendon, he returned again to Preston. Ogden retired at the end of the 1925 season just before Preston were re-admitted to Association ranks.

== Death ==
He died at a private hospital in Ivanhoe, Victoria on 13 July 1967.

== See also ==
- 1914 Sydney Carnival
- 1921 Perth Carnival
