= David Ogden =

David Ogden is the name of:

- David Ogden (politician) (born 1944), mayor from 2004 to 2010 of Hutt City in the Wellington region of New Zealand
- David Ogden (conductor) (born 1966), English composer and choral conductor
- David Ogden (wrestler) (born 1968), British Olympic wrestler
- David A. Ogden (1770–1829), U.S. Representative from New York
- David Ayres Depue Ogden (1897–1969), United States Army lieutenant general
- David W. Ogden (born 1953), American lawyer and former Deputy Attorney General
