= Ogden Reservoir =

Ogden Reservoir may refer to:

- Ogden Reservoir (Greater Manchester), near Rochdale, England
- Ogden Reservoir (Lancashire), in Haslingden Grane, England
- Ogden Reservoirs, near Barley, Lancashire, England
- Ogden Water, near Halifax, West Yorkshire, England
