= Terry Ogden =

Australian rules footballer (1911–1935)

Personal information
- Full name: Terence William John Ogden
- Born: 25 March 1911; Northcote, Victoria
- Died: 2 March 1935 (aged 23); Fairfield, Victoria
- Original team: Northcote CYMS (CYMSFA)
- Height: 178 cm (5 ft 10 in)
- Weight: 70 kg (154 lb)
- Position: Wingman

Playing career^{1}
| Years | Club | Games (Goals) |
| 1932 | Melbourne | 3 (0) |
| 1934 | Carlton | 15 (0) |
| Total | | 18 (0) |
- ^{1} Playing statistics correct to the end of 1934.

Terry Ogden (25 March 1911 – 2 March 1935) was an Australian rules footballer who played with Melbourne and Carlton in the Victorian Football League (VFL).

Ogden, born in Northcote, was the son of former Essendon captain-coach Percy and brother of teammate Gordon. Before arriving at Melbourne he had played locally for Northcote CYMS and with the Essendon reserves team. A wingman, he played the first of three games for Melbourne in a thrilling win over Hawthorn at the MCG, in round 14 of the 1935 season.

After transferring to Carlton, Ogden played 15 senior games in 1934, all in successive weeks.

Early in 1935 he fell seriously ill with pleurisy in both of his lungs and required a blood transfusion from club secretary Newton Chandler. One week later, on 2 March, Ogden died from the illness. Buried in Coburg Cemetery, Ogden had Carlton's "Most Improved" player award named after him.
