= Patty Bartlett Sessions =

American pioneer and wife of Joseph Smith (1795–1892)

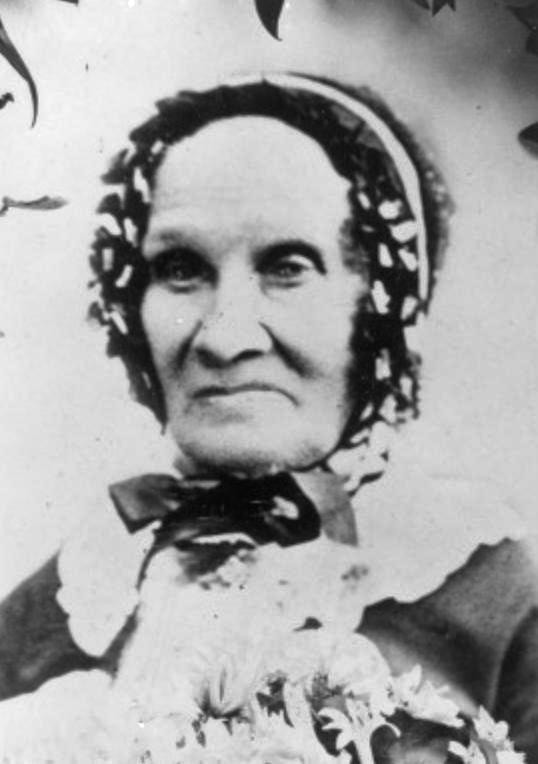
Sessions in later life

Patty Bartlett Sessions (February 4, 1795 – December 14, 1892) was an early member of the Church of Jesus Christ of Latter-day Saints (LDS Church). She was a plural wife to Joseph Smith and is celebrated for her work as a midwife for members of the church. One of her sons, Perrigrine Sessions, was the founder of Bountiful, Utah. She is best known for her diaries, which recorded the daily activities of the Latter-day Saints during the first year of the Mormon migration to the Salt Lake Valley, and the earliest days of their settlement there. These diaries document the physical, social, and religious circumstances of the settlers, especially of the women, and are frequently cited by historians. Her records are also a primary source of birth records for the Latter-day Saint community during this period, and are highly prized for documenting almost 4,000 births. Her journals are also important because they provide an inside look into Mormon polygamy.

== Life history ==
Patty Bartlett was born in Bethel, Maine, to Enoch Bartlett and Anna Hall. At age 17 on June 28, 1812, Patty married David Sessions against her parents' wishes. Immediately after the wedding they moved in with his parents. It was there that Patty began her career at a midwife by arriving at an emergency birth before her mother-in-law, who was the midwife for the area. A doctor came later, congratulated her, and commented on her natural skill in midwifery. She subsequently continued delivering children. Patty and David lived with his parents until, in 1813, they purchased and ran a farm in Ketcham, Maine. Their marriage produced 8 children; only three survived to adulthood.

Sessions's upbringing wasn't religious; she converted to the Methodist faith in her early adulthood. In 1833, having met with missionaries, she converted to the Latter Day Saint church. In the interest of marital harmony she waited until 1834 to get baptized to allow her husband time to adjust to the change. In 1835 her husband was baptized as well. After attending a conference in 1836 where church leaders preached the importance of gathering the Saints, the Sessions family moved to Far West, Missouri, until they were driven out by the Extermination Order. Leaving behind almost everything they owned, they traveled to Nauvoo, Illinois.

On March 9, 1842, Sessions was sealed to Joseph Smith as one of his plural wives.

Sessions's diaries begin with a journal that she received from her daughter, Sylvia, on February 4, 1846. Earlier diaries that she had kept since 1812 have been lost. Her diaries provide daily record for over 20 years, and included every birth she attended. After 1868, there are gaps in her record, but she continued to record entries in her diary until she was 94 years old, in 1888. Her journal also included recipes for ailments.

In 1846, Brigham Young instructed Latter-day Saints to head west, beyond the western frontier into what was then Mexico. He instructed Patty Sessions to go with the pilot company to care for the sick and afflicted, as well as to serve as midwife. She delivered nine babies on the banks of the Mississippi River, and many others on the pioneer trek. She spent the winter of 1846–47 at Winter Quarters, Nebraska, and on June 19, 1847, at 52 years old, Sessions left Winter Quarters for the West. On September 24, 1847, she arrived in the Salt Lake Valley. About the journey she wrote, "I have drove my wa[g]on all the way but part of the two last m[oun]t[ain]s."

When David died on August 11, 1850, Patty was left as a widow in a time where women struggled without a husband. She wasn't single for long as she married John Parry on December 14, 1851.

Within one year of arriving in the Salt Lake Valley, Sessions delivered 248 babies. She recorded 3,977 births with only "two difficult cases". She made an average of $2 per birth and continued to deliver babies until she was about 85 years old.

When she died on December 14, 1892, at the age of 97, she was survived by two sons, 33 grandchildren, 137 great-grandchildren, and 22 great-great-grandchildren.

== Family ==
Of the eight children that Patty produced with David Sessions only three survived to adulthood. The eldest, Perrigrine Sessions, kept journals and wrote various histories about his mother's life. These documents are used to clarify and to add to the journals written by his mother. Together, these documents produce a vivid picture of the life of one of the earliest members of the LDS Church.

Her second child, Sylvia Lyon Clark (née Sessions), was also sealed as one of Joseph Smith's wives in 1842. Sylvia waited to cross the plains until 1854. When she reached Utah Territory, she bought a farm near her mother's home in Salt Lake City.

Her youngest surviving child was named after his father, David.

== See also ==
- Origin of Latter Day Saint polygamy
