= Richard Ogden (jeweller) =

British jeweller (1919-2005)

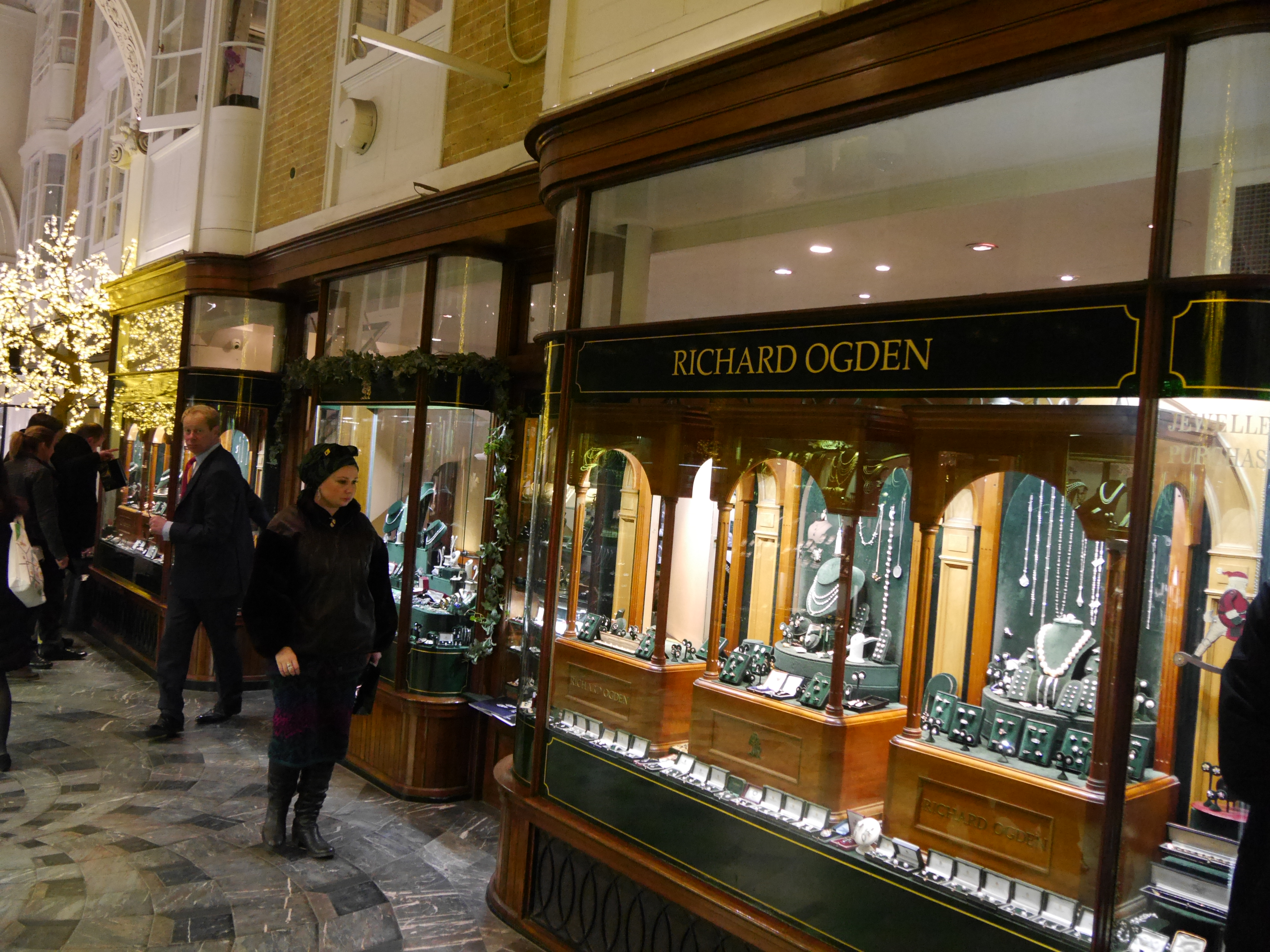
Richard Ogden store, Burlington Arcade, London

Richard William Roberts Ogden MBE (14 December 1919 – 14 October 2005), was a British jeweller, the third generation of his family in the high-end London trade.

== Early life ==
He was born in Harrogate, the son of William Ogden who was also a jeweller, with a shop in King Street, St James's. His grandfather James R Ogden, started a jewellery business in Harrogate in 1893, and later moved to London, where he had premises in Duke Street, St James's.

He was educated at Harrow School, and served in military intelligence in Burma during World War II, rising to Major, awarded an MBE and mentioned three times in dispatches.

== Career ==
In 1947, he opened a shop in Prince's Arcade, and moved to Burlington Arcade in 1951. Customers have included Cary Grant, Charlie Chaplin, Ingrid Bergman, Jack Hawkins, Claire Bloom, Audrey Hepburn, and Madonna.

== Personal life ==
Ogden married Jenny Tencate in 1946, and they had two sons and a daughter. The marriage was dissolved in 1958, and in 1960 he married Phyllis Dawson, gaining a stepson and two stepdaughters. His eldest son, Robert Ogden runs the business, still in Burlington Arcade.
