= Jonathan Ogden (disambiguation) =

Jonathan Ogden (born 1974) is an American football player.

Jonathan Ogden may also refer to:

- Jonathan Ogden (singer), founder and lead singer of English Christian band Rivers & Robots
- Jonathan Ogden (surgeon) (died 1803), Canadian surgeon and chief justice of Newfoundland
