= Wesley Ogden =

American judge (1818–1896)

Justice of the Supreme Court of Texas
- In office 1870–1873
- Preceded by: Livingston Lindsay
- Succeeded by: John David McAdoo

Chief Justice of the Supreme Court of Texas
- In office 1873–1874
- Preceded by: Lemuel D. Evans
- Succeeded by: Oran Milo Roberts

Personal details
- Born: December 16, 1818
- Died: June 15, 1896 (aged 77); San Antonio, Texas

Wesley B. Ogden (December 16, 1818 – June 15, 1896) was an American judge who served as a justice of the Supreme Court of Texas from July 1870 to August 1873, and chief justice, August 1873 to January 1874.

Born in Ohio, he moved to Texas in 1849. During his tenure on the state supreme court, he authored a controversial decision voiding the state's 1873 election.

He died in San Antonio on June 15, 1896.

Political offices
| Preceded by Livingston Lindsay | Justice of the Texas Supreme Court; 1870–1873 | Succeeded by John David McAdoo |
| Preceded by Lemuel D. Evans | Chief Justice of the Texas Supreme Court; 1873–1874 | Succeeded by Oran Milo Roberts |
