= Lucy Walker (Latter Day Saint) =

American Latter Day Saint

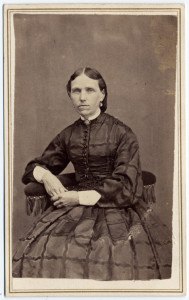
- Photograph c. 1850

Personal details
- Born: Lucy Walker; April 30, 1826; Peacham, Vermont, United States
- Died: October 1, 1910 (aged 84)
- Spouse(s): Joseph Smith; Heber C. Kimball
- Children: 9
- Parents: John Walker; Lydia Holmes

Lucy Walker was an early member of the Latter-day Saint movement and one of the plural wives of founder Joseph Smith. She was secretly sealed to Smith without the knowledge or consent of Smith's first wife, Emma Smith. Lucy was 17 at the time, while Smith was 36-years-old.

Lucy became Smith's foster daughter after her mother died, and Smith sent her father on a mission. Smith welcomed Lucy and three of her sisters into his home and called them his "daughters."

Shortly after, Smith revealed the secret doctrine of polygamy to Lucy and proposed, saying that the marriage was a "command from God" and if she refused, "the gate will be closed forever against you". Lucy refused, stating that God must manifest His will to her regarding the matter, and told him to never speak of it again. After two sleepless nights, where she considered suicide, she finally agreed to the marriage.

In 1888, as part of a project to collect testimonies of early Latter-day Saints Lucy wrote her life story in her own hand.

Why should I be chosen from among thy daughters, Father, I am only a child in years and experience, no mother to counsel [she died a few months prior]; no father near to tell me what to do in this trying hour [Smith sent him on a mission]. Oh, let this bitter cup pass. And thus I prayed in the agony of my soul.
-- Lucy Walker, ^{1888, Salt Lake City [emphasis added]}

== Early life ==
Lucy Walker was born April 30, 1826 in Peacham, Vermont. Her father joined the Church of Jesus Christ of Latter-day Saints in 1832, and her mother joined two years later.

She was baptized in 1835 along with her other siblings who were over the age of 8. She recorded that at the baptism ceremony, some of her sibling spoke in tongues, other prophecied, others gained the ability to heal the sick. Lucy wrote, "One of this little band prophecied that before we reached our destination we would be surrounded by armed mobs with blackened faces, and would need much faith in God to endure the many persecutions and trials before us, and that some of our number would lay down their lives; others would see their brethren shot down before their very eyes. This was verified at the wholesale slaughter at Haun's Mill."

She and her siblings hid with her mother less than five miles from Hawn's Mill during the massacre that happened in 1838. Her family left Missouri shortly after, moving to Quincy, Illinois, and later to Nauvoo in 1841.

== Relationship with Joseph Smith ==
=== Background ===
Lucy's mother died in January 1842, leaving her father widowed with 10 children to look after. Her death was especially hard on Lucy's father whose "health seemed to give way under this heavy affliction". Shortly, Joseph Smith came to their family home and directed Lucy's father to go on a 2-year-mission. Lucy recorded,

"The Prophet came to our rescue. He said: "If you remain here, Brother Walker, you will soon follow your wife. You must have a change of scene, a change of climate. You have just such a family as I could love. My house shall be their home. I will adopt them as my own... Place the little ones with some kind friends, and the four eldest shall come to my house and be received and treated as my own children, and if I find the others are not content or not treated right, I will bring them home and keep them until you return.""

The children were upset "at the thought of being broken up as a family, and being separated from the loved ones". Lucy's father agreed to the mission and sought to comfort his children by saying "two years would soon pass away, then with renewed health he hoped to return and make [them] a home where [they] might be together again".

Lucy lived at the Smith house for several months, and Emma and Joseph called her their "daughter" when introducing her to others.

=== Proposal ===
Joseph approached Lucy in private in 1842 and proposed polygamous marriage. Lucy recorded,

"In the year 1842 President Joseph Smith sought an interview with me, and said: "I have a message for you. I have been commanded of God to take another wife, and you are the woman." My astonishment knew no bounds. This announcement was indeed a thunderbolt to me."

Joseph fully explained the principle of plural marriage and promised that "it would prove an everlasting blessing to [Lucy's] father's house". He then invited her to pray sincerely to gain a testimony of the principle.

Lucy was unable to sleep that night as she pondered and prayed about this invitation. She wrote:

"Gross darkness instead of light took possession of my mind. I was tempted and tortured beyond endurance until life was not desirable. Oh that the grave would kindly receive me, that I might find rest on the bosom of my dear mother."

Joseph saw how upset and sorrowful she was, and approached her again. He said:

"Although I cannot, under existing circumstances, acknowledge you as my wife, the time is near when we will go beyond the Rocky Mountains and then you will be acknowledged and honored as my wife ... I have no flattering words to offer. It is a command of God to you. I will give you until to-morrow to decide this matter. If you reject this message the gate will be closed forever against you."

At this, Lucy recorded,

"I had been speechless, but at last found utterance and said: "Although you are a prophet of God you could not induce me to take a step of so great importance, unless I knew that God approved my course. I would rather die. I have tried to pray but received no comfort, no light," and emphatically forbid him speaking again to me on this subject."

Smith then promised Lucy that she would receive the witness she sought. He said:

"You shall have a manifestation of the will of God concerning you; a testimony that you can never deny. I will tell you what it shall be. It shall be that joy and peace that you never knew."

That evening, after a second sleepless night praying and asking God for this confirmation, as the sun rose, Lucy recorded,

"My room was lighted up by a heavenly influence. To me it was, in comparison, like the brilliant sun bursting through the darkest cloud. The words of the Prophet were indeed fulfilled. My soul was filled with a calm, sweet peace that "I never knew." Supreme happiness took possession of me, and I received a powerful and irresistable testimony of the truth of plural marriage."

Based on this experience, she agreed to marry him in secret.

=== Secret Wedding ===
During the 1892 Temple Lot Case depositions, Lucy was questioned by an RLDS lawyer about Emma's knowledge of the marriage. Lucy confirmed, "She [Emma] did not consent to my marriage... she did not know anything about it at all."

Lucy was married to Joseph in secret on May 1, 1842. She was 17, and Smith was 36. Many years later she recalled that her marriage to Joseph was "not a love matter ... at least on my part it was not,-but simply the giving up of myself as a sacrifice to establish that grand and glorious principle that God had revealed to the world."

=== Marriage after Smith's Death ===
After Smith's death in 1844, she remarried Heber C. Kimball, recording that her marriage to Kimball was for "time only" and that she believed she would be reunited with Smith after death to be his polygamous wife forever.

== Account of the Hawn's Mill Massacre ==
The early Latter-day Saints had experienced intense backlash and persecution because of the controversial teachings of Founder Joseph Smith. Lucy recorded that on the evening of October 29, 1838, a mob of 40 people surrounded their camp. "They hooted and yelled and looked more like demons than human beings," she wrote. The mob forced them into the snow, pointed weapons at the children, and threatened violence. A local woman jeered at them shouting, "Shoot them down! They should not be allowed to live!" However, no direct violence occurred that night.

The next morning, October 30, Lucy's father and other men in the community, including Joseph Young gathered at Hawn's Mill to discuss what to do. Lucy wrote that her father and the others were standing in the blacksmiths shop when a mob of men appeared, formed a line, and opened fire on them.

Lucy's father was shot in the right arm, and returned fire before fleeing, and remaining hidden until the violence had ceased.

Less than five miles away, a young man came running to where Lucy and the others were camped, warning them that the violent mob would soon be upon them. Chaos ensued, and many ran into the woods, fearing for their lives. Lucy's mother and one other woman remained behind in the camp, saying that fleeing would be no use. The two women calmed their children's fears.

Lucy wrote,

"We went to bed feeling that we were safe, and God was our friend; but when the morning dawned and I looked into my mother's pale face, I was positive she had not closed her eyes."

That morning, an unnamed Officer entered the camp, and offered to lead them all to safety. The group followed him and were safely reunited with the other members of the Church.
