= Richard C. Ogden =

Attorney and judge in Oklahoma

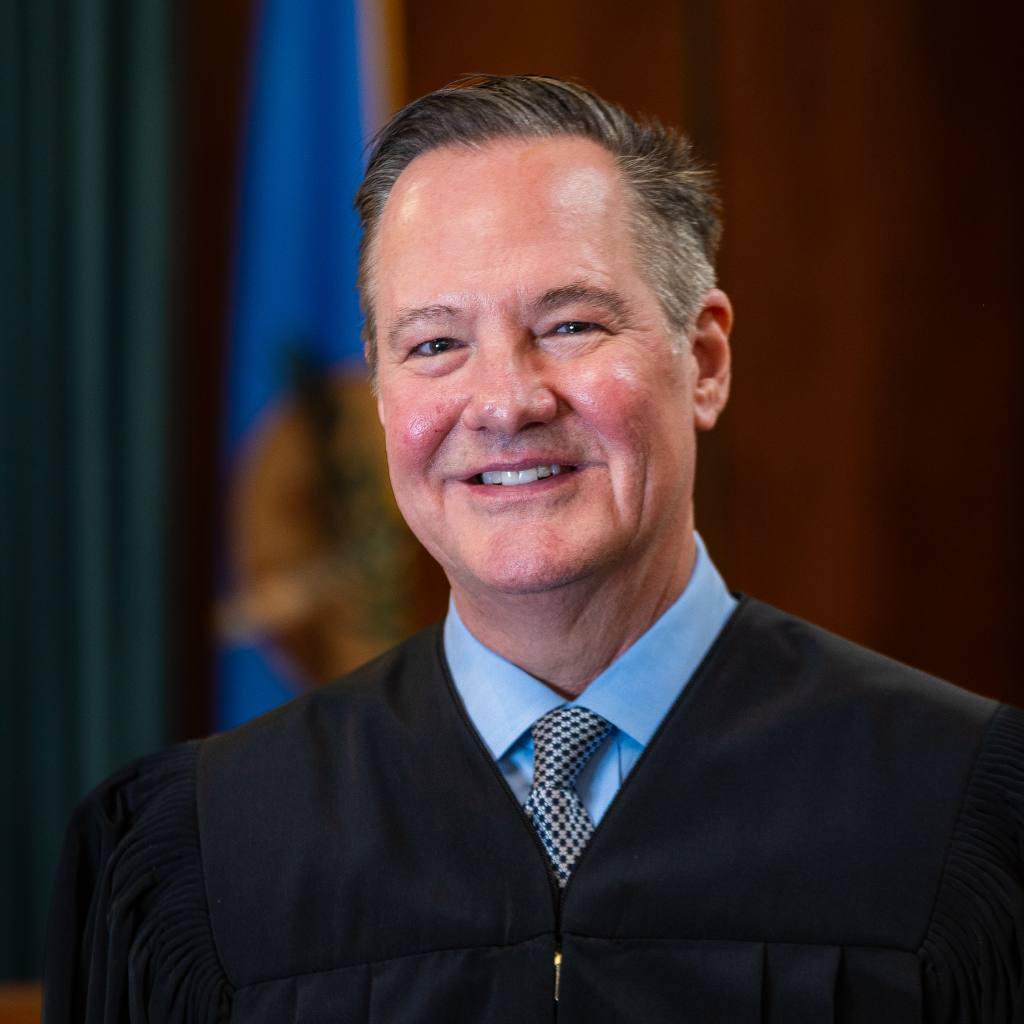

Oklahoma County district judge
- Incumbent
- Assumed office May 11, 2017
- Preceded by: Barbara Swinton

Personal details
- Born: Guymon, Oklahoma

Richard C. Ogden is an Oklahoma attorney and jurist who has served as a District Judge in Oklahoma County since 2017. A lifelong Oklahoman, Ogden has spent his career as both a litigator and a judge, dedicating his life to public service. He is seeking a third term as District Judge in 2026.

== Early life and education ==
Ogden was born and raised in Guymon, Oklahoma. He earned a B.A. in political science from Oklahoma State University in 1986 and a J.D. from the University of Oklahoma College of Law in 1989. While still a student, he became active in politics, interning and campaigning for candidates including U.S. Senator David Boren.

== Legal career ==
Ogden practiced civil litigation in Oklahoma City for more than twenty-five years, developing a reputation for thoughtful advocacy and courtroom management. He was active in the Oklahoma Bar Association, serving as Chair of the Young Lawyers Division in 1996 and later on the OBA Board of Governors.

== Public service ==
In 2010, Governor Brad Henry appointed Ogden to the Regional University System of Oklahoma, which oversees six state universities. He served as Chairperson of the Regents in 2013–2014 and resigned in 2015 when he was appointed to the judiciary. Ogden is also a graduate of Leadership Oklahoma City (Class XIX) and Leadership Oklahoma (Class XXVI).

== Judicial career ==
Ogden was appointed as a Special Judge for Oklahoma County on February 12, 2015. On May 11, 2017, Governor Mary Fallin appointed him as District Judge for Oklahoma County to succeed Judge Barbara Swinton. He was elected to that office in 2018 and re-elected in 2022. He is currently seeking a third term in 2026.

He served as President of the Oklahoma Judicial Conference (2021–2022) and as President of the Oklahoma County Bar Association (2023–2024). He is a Trustee of the Oklahoma Bar Foundation and a member of the University of Oklahoma College of Law Board of Visitors. Ogden currently serves as the Presiding Administrative Judge for the 7th and 26th Judicial Districts, overseeing all 44 courts in Oklahoma and Canadian Counties, in addition to his own civil docket.

== Awards and honors ==
- Member of two Inns of Court
- Active member of both the American Bar Association (ABA) and the Oklahoma Bar Association (OBA)
- Recipient of the Oklahoma Bar Association’s Ada Lois Sipuel Fisher Award (2023) for judicial leadership and service
- In 2023 and 2024, awarded back-to-back President’s Awards from the OBA for his achievement in revitalizing the Bench and Bar Committee and "for fostering, maintaining and promoting integrity, learning, competence and public service and improving the forum for legal discussion."

He served as President of the Oklahoma Judicial Conference (2021–2022) and as President of the Oklahoma County Bar Association (2023–2024). He is a Trustee of the Oklahoma Bar Foundation and a member of the University of Oklahoma College of Law Board of Visitors. Ogden currently serves as the Presiding Administrative Judge for the 7th and 26th Judicial Districts, overseeing all 44 courts in Oklahoma and Canadian Counties, in addition to his own civil docket.

== Personal life ==
Ogden and his husband are long-time members of St. Paul’s Episcopal Cathedral in Oklahoma City. In 2023, he received the Oklahoma Bar Association’s Ada Lois Sipuel Fisher Award for judicial leadership and service to the profession.
