= Jack Ogden (rugby league) =

English rugby league footballer

Personal information
- Full name: John Ogden
- Born: 5 March 1923 Leeds, England
- Died: 2 July 2000 (aged 77)

Playing information
Club
Years	Team	Pld	T	G	FG	P
1944–53	Featherstone Rovers	156	10	0	0	30

John "Jack" Ogden (5 March 1923 – 2 July 2000) was an English professional rugby league footballer who played in the 1940s and 1950s. He played at club level for Featherstone Rovers.

== Playing career ==
Jack Ogden was born in Leeds, West Riding of Yorkshire, England.

== Playing career ==
Jack Ogden made his début for Featherstone Rovers on Saturday 9 September 1944.

=== Testimonial match ===
Jack Ogden's benefit season at Featherstone Rovers took place during the 1954–55 season.

== Personal life ==
Jack Ogden is the older brother of the rugby league footballer who played in the 1950s for Featherstone Rovers; Maurice Ogden.
