= Alan Ogden =

English footballer

Personal information
- Full name: Alan Ogden
- Date of birth: 13 April 1954 (age 72)
- Place of birth: Thrybergh, Yorkshire, England
- Height: 5 ft 10 in (1.78 m)
- Position: Defender

Youth career
- –1971: Sheffield United

Senior career*
Years	Team	Apps	(Gls)
1971–1974	Sheffield United	12	(0)
1974	→ York City (loan)	3	(0)
1974–1975	York City	4	(0)
1975–	Huddersfield Town	0	(0)
Total		19	(0)
- * Club domestic league appearances and goals

Alan Ogden (born 15 April 1954) is an English former professional footballer who played as a defender in the Football League for Sheffield United and York City, and was on the books of Huddersfield Town without making a league appearance.
