= Clifford Ogden =

American politician (1901–1968)

Member of the Nebraska Legislature from the 8th district
- In office January 10, 1949 – January 2, 1951
- Preceded by: Henry Kosman
- Succeeded by: Bill Moulton
- In office January 5, 1943 – January 7, 1947
- Preceded by: Ernest Adams
- Succeeded by: Henry Kosman

Personal details
- Born: May 18, 1901 Plymouth County, Iowa
- Died: July 17, 1968 (aged 67) Omaha, Nebraska
- Party: Republican
- Spouse: Marcia Stoller (m. 1923)
- Children: 2
- Occupation: Finance, insurance, banking

Clifford Neville Ogden (May 18, 1901 – July 17, 1968) was a Republican politician from Nebraska who served as a member of the Nebraska Legislature from the 8th district from 1943 to 1947 and again from 1949 to 1951.

== Early life ==
Ogden was born in Plymouth County, Iowa, in 1901, and moved to Nebraska in 1915, where he grew up in Omaha. He attended business college and worked for the Securities Acceptance Corporation beginning in 1927, eventually becoming the vice president for public relations. Ogden was involved in civic affairs, serving as the president of the State Elks Association, and was active in the Nebraska Republican Party.

== Nebraska Legislature ==
In 1942, State Senator Ernest Adams ran for Douglas County Treasurer instead of seeking re-election. Ogden ran to succeed Adams in the 10th district. In the nonpartisan primary, Ogden ran against George Cornwell, the owner of a bar and restaurant, and Hal Shoemaker. In the primary, Ogden placed first, winning 40 percent of the vote, and advanced to the general election with Cornwell, who placed second with 33 percent of the vote. Ogden defeated Cornwell by a wide margin, receiving 60 percent of the vote.

Ogden ran for re-election in 1944, and he was re-elected unopposed. He did not seek a third term in 1946, citing his need to attend to his business interests following his promotion to manager of the Omaha office of the Securities Acceptance Corporation. He was succeeded by Henry Kosman, who was re-elected in 1948.

In 1949, Kosman announced that he would not serve out his second term in the legislature, and resigned, effective January 10. Governor Val Peterson appointed Ogden to serve out Kosman's term, and he was sworn in on January 10, 1949.

Ogden declined to run for re-election in 1950, and endorsed Bill Moulton as his successor.

In 1964, after redistricting took place, Moulton declined to seek re-election, and Ogden ran to succeed him in the newly drawn 10th district. He faced a crowded primary that included businessman Clifton Batchelder, banker Allen Pirsch, contractor Art McMahon, accountant Robert Gehringer, tavern owner Robert Bevins, and art student Thomas Nybbelin. Batchelder placed first by a wide margin, receiving 57 percent of the vote. On election night, it appeared as though Ogden would advance to the general election, but as the votes were tallied, Ogden slipped from second place to fourth place, and finished 52 votes behind Pirsch, who placed second.

== Death ==
Ogden died on July 17, 1968.
