= George Swan =

George Swan may refer to:

- George Swan (politician) (1833–1913), New Zealand politician, businessman and photographer
- George Swan (footballer) (born 1994), English association footballer
