= Stefan O'Connor =

English footballer

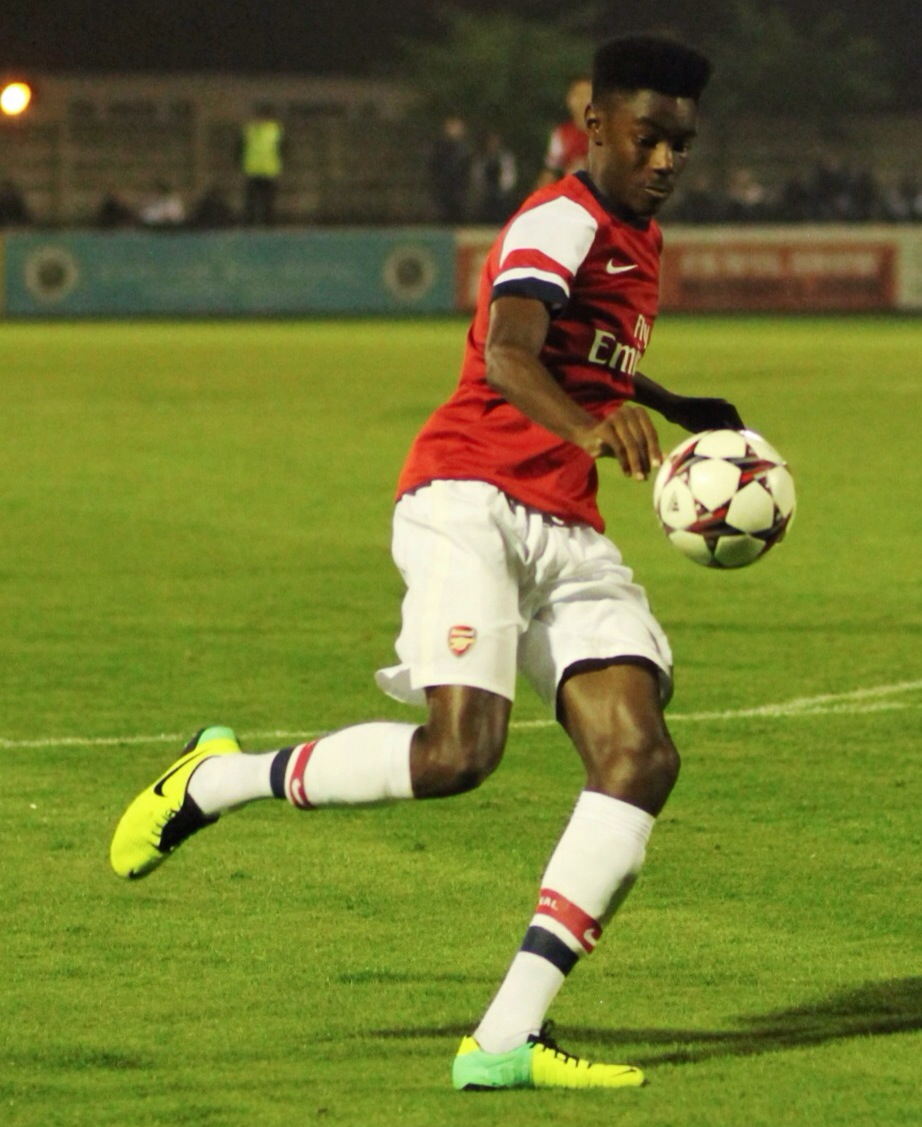
- O'Connor playing for Arsenal U19s in 2012

Personal information
- Full name: Stefan Ramone Sewell O'Connor
- Date of birth: 23 January 1997 (age 29)
- Place of birth: Croydon, England
- Height: 6 ft 4 in (1.93 m)
- Position: Defender

Youth career
- –2010: Crystal Palace
- 2010–2014: Arsenal

Senior career*
Years	Team	Apps	(Gls)
2014–2017	Arsenal	0	(0)
2015–2016	→ York City (loan)	4	(0)
2016–2017	→ MVV Maastricht (loan)	4	(0)
2017–2020	Newcastle United	0	(0)

International career
2014	England U17	2	(0)
- * Club domestic league appearances and goals as of 20:30, 15 February 2018 (UTC)

Stefan Ramone Sewell O'Connor (born 23 January 1997) is an English former professional footballer who played as a defender for Premier League club Newcastle United.

O'Connor started his career with Premier League club Arsenal, signing a professional contract in October 2013. He had loan spells with League Two club York City and Eerste Divisie club MVV Maastricht. He signed for Newcastle United in July 2017.

== Club career ==
=== Arsenal ===
O'Connor was born in Croydon, London. He joined Arsenal's academy in 2010 having previously been at Crystal Palace, and signed scholarship forms with the club in the summer of 2013. After impressive performances for the Arsenal U21s and for the U19s in the UEFA Youth League, he signed his first professional contract for the club on 10 October 2014. On 9 December 2014, O'Connor made his debut for Arsenal in a UEFA Champions League match against Galatasaray, replacing Mathieu Debuchy with 13 minutes to play as Arsenal won 4–1 away to finish second in their group.

On 26 November 2015, O'Connor joined York City of League Two on loan until 6 January 2016. He made his debut two days later after starting York's 5–1 home defeat to Accrington Stanley, in which he conceded a penalty that was scored by Josh Windass. He started at centre back, but was moved to right back later in the match due to an injury to Jordan Lussey, and continued to play for York in this position. He finished his loan at York with four appearances.

On 5 July 2016, O'Connor joined Eerste Divisie club MVV Maastricht on loan until end of the 2016–17 season. Having made only four appearances, the loan was ended prematurely on 14 April 2017. He was released by Arsenal at the end of 2016–17.

=== Newcastle United ===
O'Connor signed for Premier League club Newcastle United on 6 July 2017 on a free transfer, to play in their under-23 team. Although he had been released by the club in June 2019, he signed a short-term contract on 5 July in order to recuperate from an Anterior cruciate ligament injury he sustained in January.

== International career ==
O'Connor was capped for the England national under-17 team, playing two friendlies against Belgium in 2014.

== Style of play ==
He plays predominantly at centre back, but can also play at right back.

== Career statistics ==
As of match played 3 October 2017

Appearances and goals by club, season and competition
Club	Season	League			National Cup		League Cup		Other		Total	
Club	Season	Division	Apps	Goals	Apps	Goals	Apps	Goals	Apps	Goals	Apps	Goals
Arsenal	2014–15	Premier League	0	0	0	0	0	0	1 (Note: Appearance in UEFA Champions League)	0	1	0
Arsenal	2015–16	Premier League	0	0	0	0	0	0	0	0	0	0
Arsenal	2016–17	Premier League	0	0	0	0	—		—		0	0
Arsenal	Total		0	0	0	0	0	0	1	0	1	0
York City (loan)	2015–16	League Two	4	0	—		—		—		4	0
MVV Maastricht (loan)	2016–17	Eerste Divisie	4	0	0	0	—		—		4	0
Newcastle United	2017–18	Premier League	0	0	0	0	0	0	—		0	0
Newcastle United U21	2017–18	—			—		—		1 (Note: Appearance in EFL Trophy)	0	1	0
Career total			8	0	0	0	0	0	1	0	9	0
