= Rzońca =

Rzońca or Rzonca is a Polish surname. Notable people with the surname include:

- Bogdan Rzońca (born 1961), Polish politician
- Callum Rzonca (born 1997), English footballer
