= Ben Hirst =

English association football player

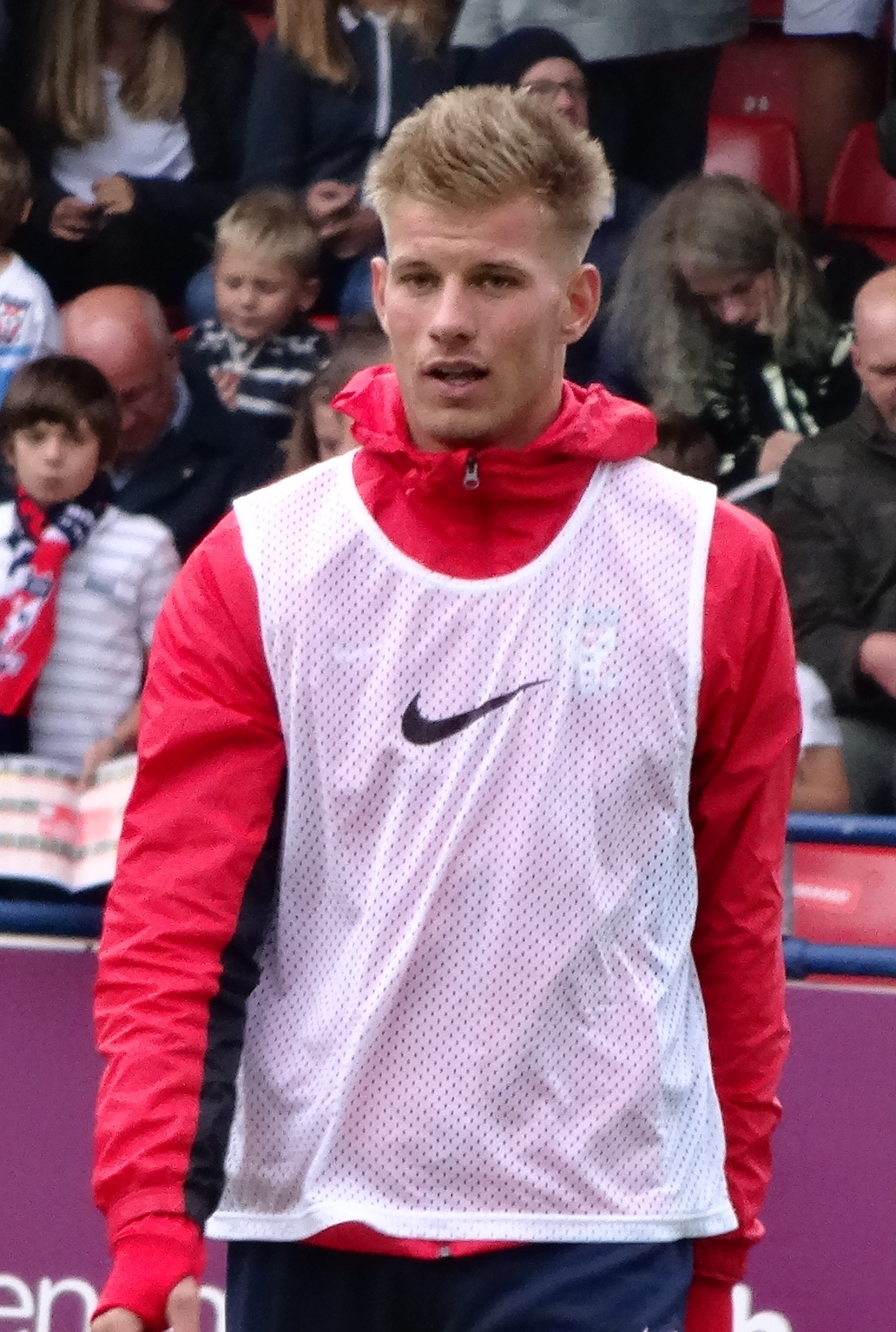
- Hirst training with York City in 2014

Personal information
- Full name: Benjamin Matthew Hirst
- Date of birth: 21 October 1997 (age 29)
- Place of birth: York, England
- Height: 6 ft 0 in (1.83 m)
- Position: Striker

Youth career
- –2014: York City

Senior career*
Years	Team	Apps	(Gls)
2014–2016	York City	3	(0)
2015	→ Scarborough Athletic (loan)	3	(0)
2016	Pickering Town	0	(0)
Total		6	(0)
- * Club domestic league appearances and goals

Benjamin Matthew Hirst (born 21 October 1997) is an English former professional footballer who played as a striker.

Hirst started his career in York City's youth system, making his first-team debut in 2014. He had a loan spell with Northern Premier League Division One North club Scarborough Athletic in 2015, before being released by York in 2016. Hirst had a short with Pickering Town in the Northern Counties East League Premier Division.

== Career ==
Born in York, Hirst played for York & District Schoolboys and was named their Most Valuable Player at an end of season awards ceremony in June 2013. He later joined York City's youth system and became a first-year scholar in the summer of 2014. He made his first-team debut aged 16 as a 73rd-minute substitute for Ryan Jarvis in a 1–1 away draw with Tranmere Rovers in the opening match of the 2014–15 season on 9 August 2014. Having made five first-team appearances, he signed a professional contract with York in November 2014, tying him to the club until the summer of 2016.

Hirst joined Northern Premier League Division One North club Scarborough Athletic on a one-month loan on 29 September 2015, with his chances at York limited. He made his debut that day, as a substitute in a 4–2 away defeat to Clitheroe. He returned to York in November 2015, having made four appearances for Scarborough. Hirst was released by York when his contract expired at the end of 2015–16.

After a successful trial, Hirst joined Northern Counties East League Premier Division club Pickering Town in the summer of 2016. In August 2016, he retired from football after deciding to focus on his carpet cleaning business.

== Career statistics ==
Appearances and goals by club, season and competition
Club	Season	League			FA Cup		League Cup		Other		Total	
Club	Season	Division	Apps	Goals	Apps	Goals	Apps	Goals	Apps	Goals	Apps	Goals
York City	2014–15	League Two	3	0	0	0	1	0	1 (Note: Appearance in Football League Trophy)	0	5	0
York City	2015–16	League Two	0	0	0	0	0	0	0	0	0	0
York City	Total		3	0	0	0	1	0	1	0	5	0
Scarborough Athletic (loan)	2015–16	NPL Division One North	3	0	—		—		1 (Note: Appearance in FA Trophy)	0	4	0
Pickering Town	2016–17	NECL Premier Division	—		0	0	—		—		0	0
Career total			6	0	0	0	1	0	2	0	9	0
