= Matty Dixon =

English footballer

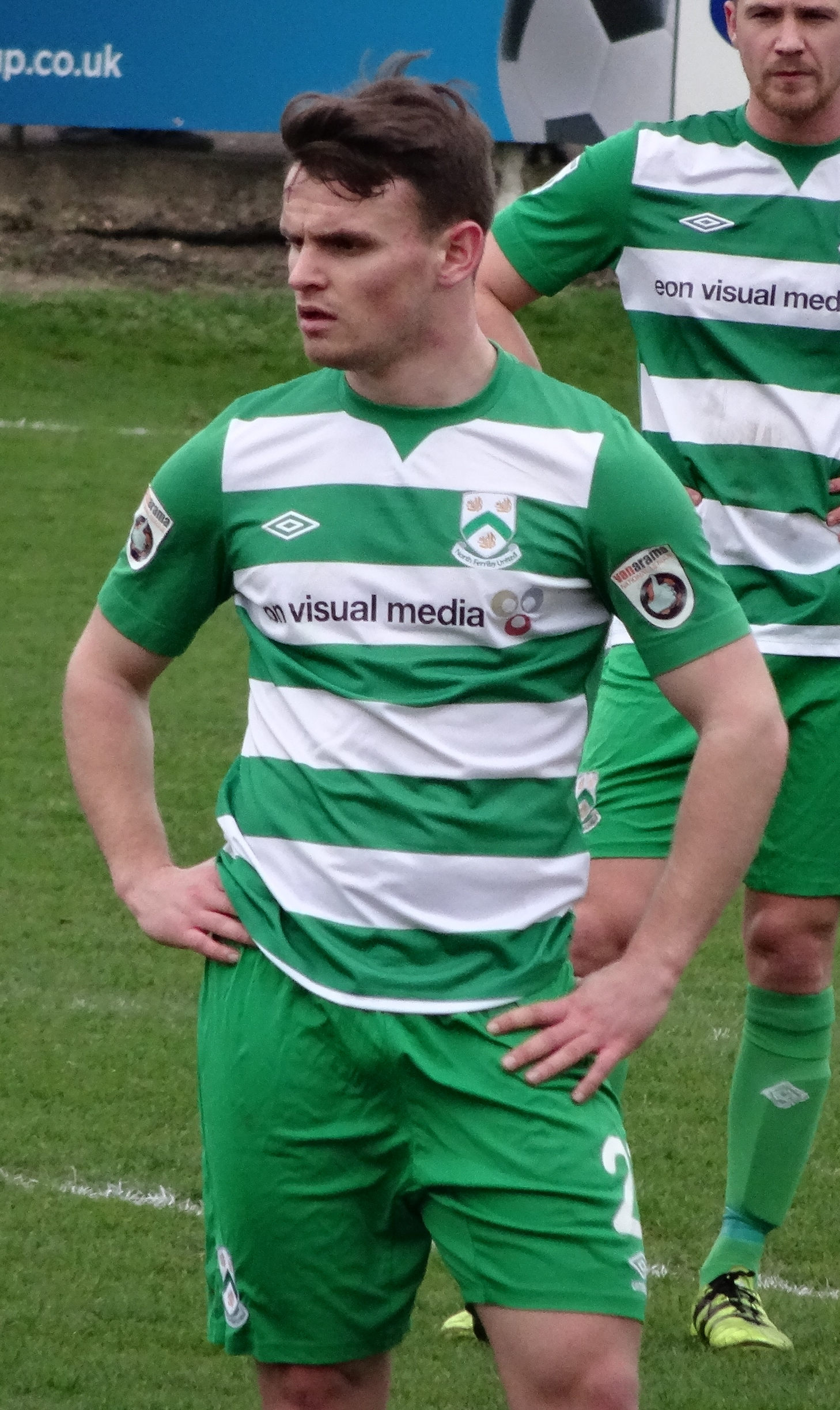
- Dixon playing for North Ferriby United in 2017

Personal information
- Full name: Matthew Dixon
- Date of birth: 19 December 1994 (age 31)
- Place of birth: Kingston upon Hull, England
- Height: 5 ft 9 in (1.74 m)
- Position: Midfielder

Team information
- Current team: Whitby Town

Youth career
- 200?–2014: Hull City

Senior career*
Years	Team	Apps	(Gls)
2014–2016	Hull City	0	(0)
2014–2015	→ Gainsborough Trinity (loan)	7	(0)
2016–2017	York City	20	(0)
2017	North Ferriby United	15	(0)
2017–2018	Spennymoor Town	28	(0)
2018–2019	Scarborough Athletic		
2019–	Whitby Town		
- * Club domestic league appearances and goals as of 22:27, 9 March 2020 (UTC)

Matthew Dixon (born 19 December 1994) is an English semi-professional footballer who plays as a midfielder for Northern Premier League Premier Division club Whitby Town. He has played in the Football League for York City.

Dixon started his career with hometown club Hull City, signing a professional contract in May 2013. He had a loan spell with Conference North club Gainsborough Trinity in the 2014–15 season, before making his first-team debut for Hull in a League Cup match in August 2015. Dixon signed for League Two club York City in January 2016, although the club was relegated to the National League in 2015–16. He signed for National League club North Ferriby United in February 2017 before spending 2017–18 with National League North club Spennymoor Town.

== Early life ==
Dixon was born in Kingston upon Hull, Humberside. He was raised in Brandesburton and attended Hornsea School.

== Career ==
=== Hull City ===
Dixon began his career with Hull City's youth system at the age of eight and went on to captain the under-18 and under-21 teams. After progressing through the youth teams at the club, he signed a professional contract in May 2013. He joined Conference North club Gainsborough Trinity one a one-month loan on 23 December 2014, making his debut three days later starting in a 3–0 home win over North Ferriby United. Dixon finished the loan with seven appearances. He made his first-team debut for Hull on 11 August 2015 in a League Cup match against Accrington Stanley.

=== York City ===
Dixon signed for League Two club York City on 15 January 2016 on a one-and-a-half-year contract on a free transfer. He was signed as a replacement for Ben Godfrey, who had left York for Premier League club Norwich City. His debut came on 23 January 2016 as a starter in York's 1–1 away draw with Carlisle United, and manager Jackie McNamara commented that he was "excellent for his debut and passed the ball well on a difficult afternoon". According to Dave Flett of The Press, however, Dixon "found it difficult to impose himself on proceedings", and that he would "need to come to terms with the speed of the professional game if he is to progress next season". He made seven appearances for York in 2015–16 as they were relegated to the National League after finishing bottom of League Two.

In January 2017, Dixon was told he was surplus to requirements by York manager Gary Mills. Having made 14 appearances in 2016–17, Dixon left York by mutual consent on 3 February 2017.

=== Later career ===
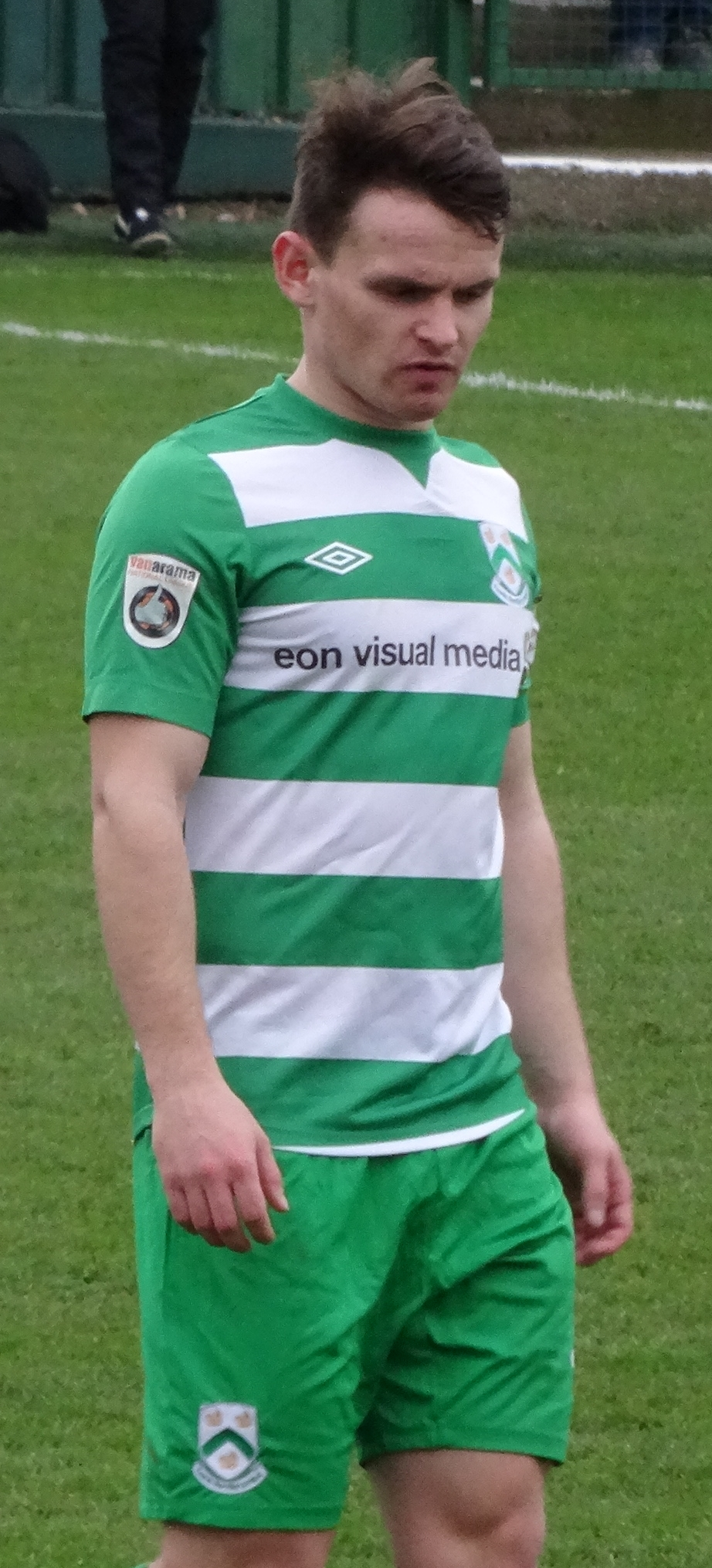
Dixon playing for North Ferriby United in 2017

Dixon signed for National League club North Ferriby United on 7 February 2017. He finished 2016–17 with 15 appearances for North Ferriby, as the club was relegated to the National League North with a bottom-place ranking in the National League. Dixon signed for newly promoted National League North club Spennymoor Town on 3 July 2017. He was released at the end of 2017–18.

After a successful trial, Dixon signed for newly promoted Northern Premier League Premier Division club Scarborough Athletic on 22 July 2018. He signed for Scarborough's divisional rivals Whitby Town on 12 June 2019.

== Career statistics ==
As of end of 2017–18 season

Appearances and goals by club, season and competition
Club	Season	League			FA Cup		League Cup		Other		Total	
Club	Season	Division	Apps	Goals	Apps	Goals	Apps	Goals	Apps	Goals	Apps	Goals
Hull City	2014–15	Premier League	0	0	—		0	0	—		0	0
Hull City	2015–16	Championship	0	0	0	0	1	0	—		1	0
Hull City	Total		0	0	0	0	1	0	—		1	0
Gainsborough Trinity (loan)	2014–15	Conference North	7	0	—		—		—		7	0
York City	2015–16	League Two	7	0	—		—		—		7	0
York City	2016–17	National League	13	0	1	0	—		0	0	14	0
York City	Total		20	0	1	0	—		0	0	21	0
North Ferriby United	2016–17	National League	15	0	—		—		—		15	0
Spennymoor Town	2017–18	National League North	28	0	1	0	—		6 (Note: Appearances in FA Trophy)	0	35	0
Career total			70	0	2	0	1	0	6	0	79	0
