= Jordan Lussey =

English footballer (born 1994)

Personal information
- Full name: Jordan Lussey
- Date of birth: 2 November 1994 (age 31)
- Place of birth: Ormskirk, England
- Height: 6 ft 0 in (1.83 m)
- Position: Midfielder

Team information
- Current team: Bootle

Youth career
- 2002–2014: Liverpool

Senior career*
Years	Team	Apps	(Gls)
2014–2015	Liverpool	0	(0)
2015	→ Bolton Wanderers (loan)	0	(0)
2015–2016	Bolton Wanderers	0	(0)
2015	→ York City (loan)	1	(0)
2016–2017	Southport	17	(4)
2017–2018	Telford United	40	(3)
2018	Chorley		
2018	→ Witton Albion (dual registration)	3	(0)
2018–2019	Nuneaton Borough	6	(0)
2019	Nuneaton Borough	8	(1)
2019–2020	Marine	14	(3)
2020–2021	AFC Fylde	10	(0)
2021–2022	Curzon Ashton	34	(1)
2022–2024	Marine	49	(2)
2025–	Bootle	0	(0)

International career
2011–2012	England U18	2	(0)
- * Club domestic league appearances and goals as of 19:45, 28 January 2025 (UTC)

Jordan Lussey (born 2 November 1994) is an English professional footballer who plays as a midfielder for Bootle. He has played for Liverpool, Bolton Wanderers, York City, Southport, Telford United, Chorley, Nuneaton Borough, Curzon Ashton and AFC Fylde.

== Club career ==
=== Liverpool ===
Lussey was born in Ormskirk, Lancashire. He played for Ormskirk Cross Hall before joining Liverpool, the club he grew up supporting, in 2002. He progressed through the club's academy, before captaining the under-18 team and establishing himself in the under-21s.

=== Bolton Wanderers ===
On 26 March 2015, Lussey joined Championship club Bolton Wanderers on loan for the remainder of the 2014–15 season. He did not make any appearances in the first team, but did impress for their development squad. Lussey signed a permanent one-year contract with Bolton on 12 July 2015, which would see him initially play with the under-21 and development teams.

On 26 November 2015, Lussey joined League Two club York City on a one-month loan. He made his debut two days later as a right-back in a 5–1 home defeat to Accrington Stanley, and played 68 minutes before being substituted for George Swan. At the end of 2015–16, Bolton confirmed that he would be leaving when his contract expired at the end of June 2016.

=== Southport ===
In September 2016, Lussey signed for National League club Southport.

=== A.F.C. Telford United ===
He signed for National League North club A.F.C. Telford United on 8 August 2017. He left the club at the end of 2017–18.

=== Chorley ===
In September 2018 he joined Chorley. At the end of this spell with the club he went to Witton Albion on dual registration terms where he played three league games in December 2018.

He left his parent and dual registration clubs at the end of December 2018.

=== Nuneaton Borough ===
He then joined Nuneaton Borough at the end of December 2018 making his debut for the club on New Year's Day 2019. After three league appearances he left the club to go and speak to clubs in Asia.

In March 2019 he rejoined Nuneaton.

=== Marine ===
In November 2019 he returned to Merseyside, signing for Marine. He left the club at the end of the season, seeking to play at a higher level.

=== AFC Fylde ===
He then signed for AFC Fylde.

=== Curzon Ashton ===
He signed for Curzon Ashton in 2021.

=== Return to Marine ===
Lussey returned to Marine in August 2022. He was part of the Marine side which won the Liverpool Senior Cup in 2023, scoring a penalty in the shootout.

=== Bootle ===
On 28 January 2025, Lussey joined Northern Premier League Division One West side Bootle.

== International career ==
Lussey made his debut for the England national under-18 team on 16 November 2011 as a half-time substitute for Max Clayton in a 1–1 away draw with Slovakia. His second and last cap came on 7 March 2012 after starting a 3–0 home win over Poland, in which he was substituted for Jack Dunn on 61 minutes.

== Career statistics ==
As of end of 2017–18 season

Appearances and goals by club, season and competition
Club	Season	League			FA Cup		League Cup		Other		Total	
Club	Season	Division	Apps	Goals	Apps	Goals	Apps	Goals	Apps	Goals	Apps	Goals
Liverpool	2014–15	Premier League	0	0	0	0	0	0	0	0	0	0
Bolton Wanderers (loan)	2014–15	Championship	0	0	—		—		—		0	0
Bolton Wanderers	2015–16	Championship	0	0	0	0	0	0	—		0	0
Bolton Wanderers	Total		0	0	0	0	0	0	—		0	0
York City (loan)	2015–16	League Two	1	0	—		—		—		1	0
Southport	2016–17	National League	12	1	3	0	—		1 (Note: Appearance(s) in FA Trophy)	1	16	2
A.F.C. Telford United	2017–18	National League North	34	3	4	0	—		2	0	40	3
Career total			47	4	7	0	0	0	3	1	57	5
