= Kenny McEvoy =

Irish footballer

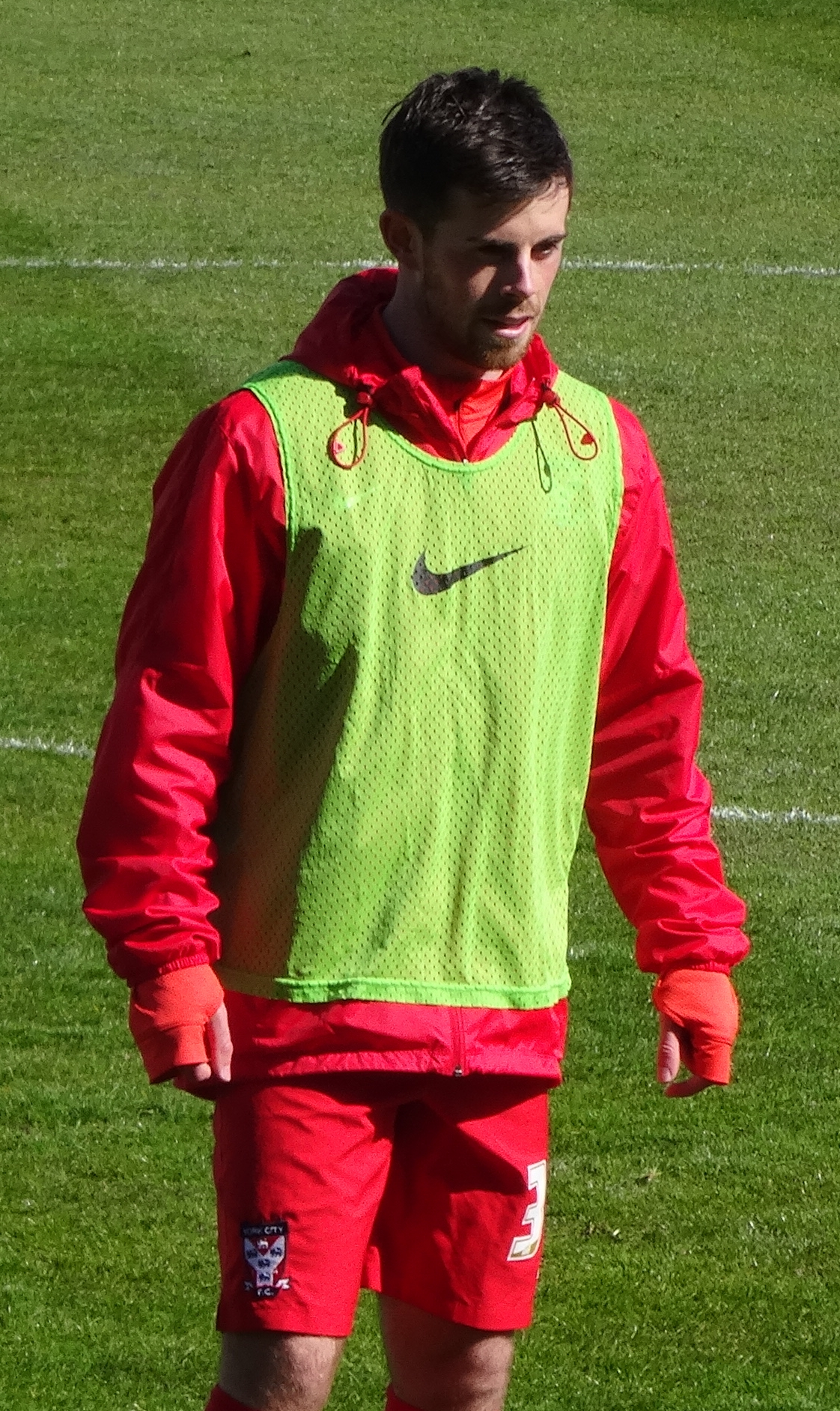
- McEvoy training with York City in 2016

Personal information
- Full name: Kenneth McEvoy
- Date of birth: 4 September 1994 (age 32)
- Place of birth: Waterford, Ireland
- Height: 1.76 m (5 ft 9 1/2 in)
- Position: Winger

Youth career
- 2011–2014: Tottenham Hotspur

Senior career*
Years	Team	Apps	(Gls)
2014–2016	Tottenham Hotspur	0	(0)
2014	→ Peterborough United (loan)	7	(1)
2015	→ Colchester United (loan)	1	(0)
2015	→ Stevenage (loan)	1	(0)
2015–2016	→ York City (loan)	4	(0)
2016	York City	15	(2)
2016–2017	South Normanton Athletic	10	(5)
2017	Waterford	16	(1)
2017	South Normanton Athletic	12	(7)

International career
2011	Republic of Ireland U17	2	(0)
2013	Republic of Ireland U19	3	(0)
2014–2015	Republic of Ireland U21	7	(0)
- * Club domestic league appearances and goals as of 01:01, 11 August 2017 (UTC)

Kenneth McEvoy (born 4 September 1994) is an Irish retired professional footballer.

McEvoy started his career with Tottenham Hotspur, and had loan spells at Peterborough United, Colchester United, Stevenage and York City. He joined York permanently in January 2016, before being released at the end of the 2015–16 season. He signed for hometown club Waterford in early 2017 but departed the club in August of that year.

== Club career ==
=== Tottenham Hotspur ===
McEvoy was born in Waterford, County Waterford, where he played at the under-21 level with Villa FC. He joined the Tottenham Hotspur academy in July 2011. Since joining the Tottenham Academy, McEvoy quickly make an impact for the team, where he played for the under-18 team and scored eight goals in twenty-two appearances in the 2011–12 season.

In the middle of the 2012–13 season, McEvoy was promoted to the under-21 team and first featured for the reserve team when he appeared as an unused substitute against Liverpool U23 on 11 February 2013. He then made his Tottenham Reserve debut against Arsenal U21 on 23 February 2013, setting up one of the goals, in a 4–2 win. His first goal came on 11 March 2013, in a 4–0 win over West Bromwich Albion Reserve. At the end of the 2012–13 season, McEvoy went on to make eleven appearances and scored three times.

In the 2013–14 season, McEvoy continued to feature for the under-21 team and scored his first goal of the season, in a 1–1 draw against Leicester City U23 on 21 October 2013. In November 2013, McEvoy was called up by the first team for the first time ahead of the UEFA Europa League match against Tromsø in Norway, but was used as an unused substitute. Following this, McEvoy scored two goals in the next two matches on 13 December 2013 and 14 January 2013 against Fulham U23 and Newcastle United U23. Then, in February 2014, McEvoy was featured again in the first team, where he was once again as an unused substitute in a UEFA Europa League match against Dnipro Dnipropetrovsk on 20 February 2014. As the 2013–14 season progressed, he went on to make eighteen appearances and scoring five times.

After being recalled by his parent club on 11 November 2014, whilst on loan at Peterborough United, McEvoy returned to the club's reserve team, where he started the whole game, in a 2–0 win over Fulham U23. Shortly being recalled once again by his parent club, whilst at Colchester United, McEvoy scored on his return for the club's reserve team, in a 1–1 draw against Manchester United U23 on 3 March 2015. He scored again for the team, several weeks later on 23 March 2015, in a 3–1 loss against Leicester City U23. Having spent the whole season on loan in the 2014–15 season, McEvoy went on to score two goals in ten appearances. For his performance, McEvoy signed an 18-month contract.

In the 2015–16 season, McEvoy went on to make five appearances and scoring three times for the reserve team, including a brace against Leicester City U23 on 21 September 2015. He also scored against Manchester City U21 on 14 August 2015.

==== Loan spells ====
McEvoy joined League One club Peterborough United a youth loan for the 2014–15 season on 24 July 2014. On 9 August 2014, he made his senior debut against Rochdale. McEvoy scored his first goal a week later, with a deflected shot in a 3–2 home win over Milton Keynes Dons. He was recalled by Tottenham on 11 November 2014, having made eight appearances for Peterborough.

On 30 January 2015, he joined Colchester United of League One on a youth loan until the end of 2014–15, but only managed one appearance before being recalled by Tottenham.

On 26 September 2015, McEvoy joined League Two club Stevenage on a one-month loan. He made his Stevenage debut against Cambridge United on the same day, coming on as a seventy-first-minute substitute in a 1–0 defeat. This was his only appearance for Stevenage before the loan expired.

=== York City ===
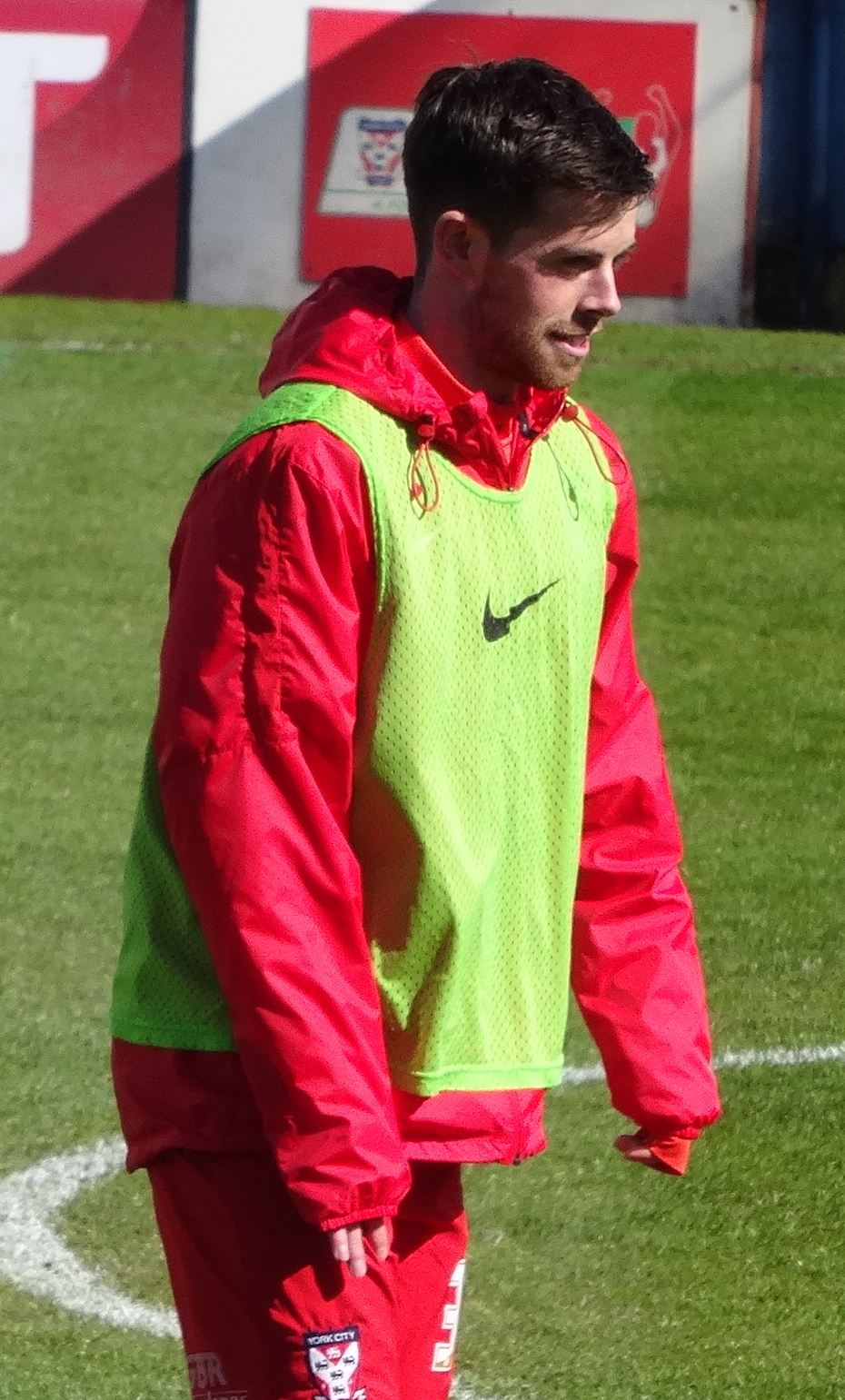
McEvoy training with York City in 2016

On 25 November 2015, McEvoy joined League Two club York City on loan until 2 January 2016. He made his York City debut on 28 November 2015, three days after signing for the club, making his first start, in a 5–1 loss against Accrington Stanley. Having impressed manager Jackie McNamara in his four appearances for York, McEvoy joined the club on a permanent contract for the rest of 2015–16 on 5 January 2016.

McEvoy's first game after signing for the club on a permanent basis came on 16 January 2016, making a start, in 1–0 loss against Newport County. Several weeks later, on 30 January 2016, he scored his first York City goal, in a 2–1 win over Stevenage. His second goal came on 30 April 2016, in a 4–1 loss against Bristol Rovers. After seeing the York City relegated from the League Two, McEvoy went on to make twenty appearances and scoring twice for the team.

He was released by York when his contract expired at the end of 2015–16.

=== South Normanton Athletic and Waterford ===
After leaving York City, McEvoy moved to East Midlands Counties League club South Normanton Athletic, where he briefly stayed there, as he made twelve appearances and scoring seven times in all competitions.

After leaving South Normanton Athletic, McEvoy was linked a move back to his hometown country, with a tug of war between Waterford and Sligo Rovers expressed interests in him. McEvoy signed for League of Ireland First Division club Waterford on 25 January 2017 and made his Waterford debut on 24 February 2017, playing the whole game, in a 1–0 loss against Athlone Town. Kenny scored his first goal for Waterford against Cobh Ramblers in a crucial 2–1 victory at the RSC. After featuring 18 times for Waterford, McEvoy left the club by mutual consent, after committing to a full-time job in England.

On 10 August 2017, McEvoy re-signed for South Normanton Athletic, with the club now in the Midland League Premier Division.

== International career ==
McEvoy has represented the Republic of Ireland at under-17, under-19 and under-21 levels.

== Style of play ==
McEvoy plays as a winger and has been praised for his pace and crossing.

== Personal life ==
In June 2015, McEvoy married his wife, Toni and became a father when his wife gave birth to a baby girl named Dolly on 26 September 2016.

McEvoy earned attention from both the British and Irish media, due to his resemblance of his then teammate Gareth Bale.

== Career statistics ==
As of match played 30 June 2017

Appearances and goals by club, season and competition
Club	Season	League			National Cup		League Cup (Note: Appearances in League Cup and League of Ireland Cup)		Other		Total	
Club	Season	Division	Apps	Goals	Apps	Goals	Apps	Goals	Apps	Goals	Apps	Goals
Tottenham Hotspur	2014–15	Premier League	0	0	0	0	0	0	0	0	0	0
Tottenham Hotspur	2015–16	Premier League	0	0	0	0	0	0	0	0	0	0
Tottenham Hotspur	Total		0	0	0	0	0	0	0	0	0	0
Peterborough United (loan)	2014–15	League One	7	1	0	0	1	0	0	0	8	1
Colchester United (loan)	2014–15	League One	1	0	—		—		—		1	0
Stevenage (loan)	2015–16	League Two	1	0	—		—		—		1	0
York City	2015–16	League Two	19	2	—		—		—		19	2
South Normanton Athletic	2016–17	East Midlands Counties League	10	5	—		—		2 (Note: Appearances in Derbyshire Senior Cup)	2	12	7
Waterford	2017	League of Ireland First Division	16	1	—		2	0	—		18	1
South Normanton Athletic	2017–18	Midland League Premier Division	0	0	0	0	—		0	0	0	0
Career total			54	9	0	0	3	0	2	2	59	11
