= Ntumba Massanka =

English footballer (born 1996)

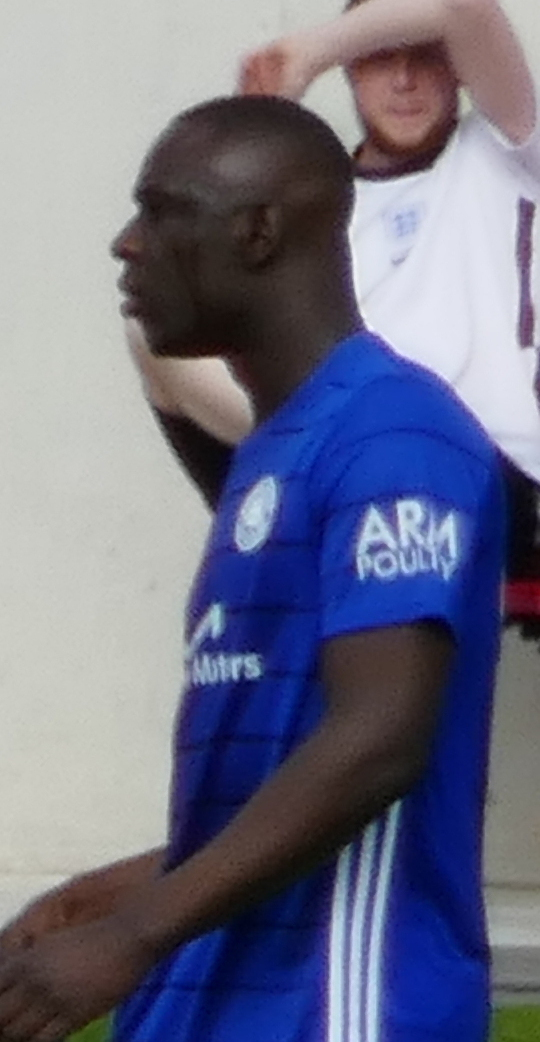
- Massanka playing for Boston United in 2022

Personal information
- Full name: Ntumba Massanka
- Date of birth: 30 November 1996 (age 29)
- Place of birth: Tottenham, England
- Height: 6 ft 3 in (1.91 m)
- Position: Striker

Team information
- Current team: Daisy Hill

Youth career
- Manchester United
- Manchester City
- 2013–2015: Burnley

Senior career*
Years	Team	Apps	(Gls)
2015–2019	Burnley	0	(0)
2016	→ York City (loan)	3	(0)
2016–2017	→ Morecambe (loan)	10	(0)
2017	→ Wrexham (loan)	18	(4)
2017–2018	→ Wrexham (loan)	24	(2)
2018	→ Dover Athletic (loan)	3	(0)
2019	→ RWDM47 (loan)	12	(1)
2019–2020	Chorley	24	(3)
2020	ASD Angelana		
2021–2023	South Shields	13	(5)
2022	→ Stalybridge Celtic (loan)	7	(1)
2022	→ Boston United (loan)	11	(0)
2022	→ Stafford Rangers (loan)	14	(1)
2023	Macclesfield	13	(2)
2023–2024	Digenis Akritas Morphou	18	(2)
2024	Stalybridge Celtic	3	(0)
2024–2025	Warrington Rylands	17	(5)
2025	→ Clitheroe (loan)	14	(2)
2025–	Daisy Hill	0	(0)
- * Club domestic league appearances and goals as of 13:37, 12 September 2025 (UTC)

Ntumba Massanka (born 30 November 1996) is an English professional footballer who plays as a striker for North West Counties League Division One North club Daisy Hill.

== Career ==
Massanka was born in Tottenham, London, and moved to Manchester aged four, as his parents relocated with their work as pastors. He was signed by Manchester United after being scouted, and spent six years with the club before a short stint with rivals Manchester City. He joined Burnley in the summer of 2013, before signing a professional contract with the club on 15 April 2015. Having started the 2015–16 season with 16 goals from 14 starts for the under-21 team, Massanka signed a new contract with Burnley on 23 December 2015. He joined League Two club York City, on loan for the rest of 2015–16 on 12 January 2016, making his debut four days later as a 56th-minute substitute in a 1–0 home defeat to Newport County. Having made only three appearances for York, Massanka was recalled by Burnley on 11 March 2016.

On 31 August 2016, Massanka joined League Two club Morecambe on loan until 3 January 2017. In January 2017, he returned to Burnley, having failed to make an impact at the club with all 10 of his appearances coming from the bench.

On 12 January 2017, Massanka joined National League club Wrexham on loan until the end of 2016–17, after being recommended to the club by Brian Flynn. He made his debut two days later as a 68th-minute substitute in a 1–0 home victory over North Ferriby United. Massanka scored his first senior goal with an overhead kick which was the equaliser in Wrexham's 3–1 home win over Guiseley on 4 February 2017.

He returned to Wrexham for a second time in July 2017, signing on an initial six-month loan deal. He scored two goals in 26 appearances before returning to Burnley in January 2018. He was loaned out to Dover Athletic on 30 August 2018.

On 10 January 2019, Massanka joined Belgian First Amateur Division side RWDM47 on loan until the end of the season. He was released by Burnley at the end of the season.

He joined newly promoted National League side Chorley on 3 August 2019, signing a one-year contract.

In February 2020, Massanka joined Eccellenza side ASD Angelana on a deal until the end of the season.

In July 2021, Massanka returned to English football to join Northern Premier League side South Shields.

In January 2022 he joined Stalybridge Celtic on loan for the remainder of the season. On 26 February it was confirmed that he had been recalled by South Shields from the loan period. He subsequently joined Boston United and then Stafford Rangers on loan.

In January 2023, Massanka left South Shields to join Northern Premier League side Macclesfield.

In March 2024, Massanka returned to Stalybridge Celtic on a permanent basis following a short spell in Cyprus with Digenis Akritas Morphou. In May 2024, he joined Warrington Rylands. On 29 January 2025, he joined Clitheroe on a one-month loan deal.

In September 2025, Massanka joined North West Counties League Division One North club Daisy Hill.

== Career statistics ==
As of end of 2024–25 season

Appearances and goals by club, season and competition
Club	Season	League			National Cup		League Cup		Other		Total	
Club	Season	Division	Apps	Goals	Apps	Goals	Apps	Goals	Apps	Goals	Apps	Goals
Burnley	2015–16	Championship	0	0	0	0	0	0	—		0	0
Burnley	2016–17	Premier League	0	0	0	0	0	0	—		0	0
Burnley	2017–18	Premier League	0	0	0	0	—		—		0	0
Burnley	Total		0	0	0	0	0	0	—		0	0
York City (loan)	2015–16	League Two	3	0	—		—		—		3	0
Morecambe (loan)	2016–17	League Two	10	0	0	0	—		0	0	10	0
Wrexham (loan)	2016–17	National League	18	4	—		—		—		18	4
Wrexham (loan)	2017–18	National League	24	2	1	0	—		1 (Note: Appearance in FA Trophy)	0	26	2
Wrexham (loan)	Total		42	6	1	0	—		1	0	44	6
Dover Athletic (loan)	2018–19	National League	3	0	—		—		—		3	0
RWDM47 (loan)	2018–19	Belgian First Amateur Division	12	1	—		—		—		12	1
Chorley	2019–20	National League	24	3	2	0	—		2	0	28	3
South Shields	2021–22	NPL Premier Division	13	5	2	0	—		0	0	15	5
Stalybridge Celtic (loan)	2021–22	NPL Premier Division	7	1	—		—		—		7	1
Boston United (loan)	2021–22	National League North	11	0	—		—		3 (Note: Appearances in National League North play-offs)	0	14	0
Stafford Rangers (loan)	2022–23	NPL Premier Division	14	1	1	0	—		3 (Note: Two appearances in FA Trophy, one appearance in Staffordshire Senior Cup)	0	18	1
Macclesfield	2022–23	NPL Division One West	13	2	0	0	—		0	0	13	2
Digenis Akritas Morphou	2023–24	Cypriot Second Division	15	2	1	0	—		3 (Note: Appearance(s) in Cypriot Second Division relegation play-offs)	0	19	2
Stalybridge Celtic	2023–24	NPL Division One West	3	0	0	0	—		0	0	3	0
Warrington Rylands	2024–25	NPL Premier Division	17	5	4	1	—		3	1	24	7
Clitheroe (loan)	2024–25	NPL Division One West	14	2	0	0	—		0	0	14	2
Career total			201	28	11	1	0	0	15	1	227	30
