= Reece Thompson (footballer) =

English footballer (born 1993)

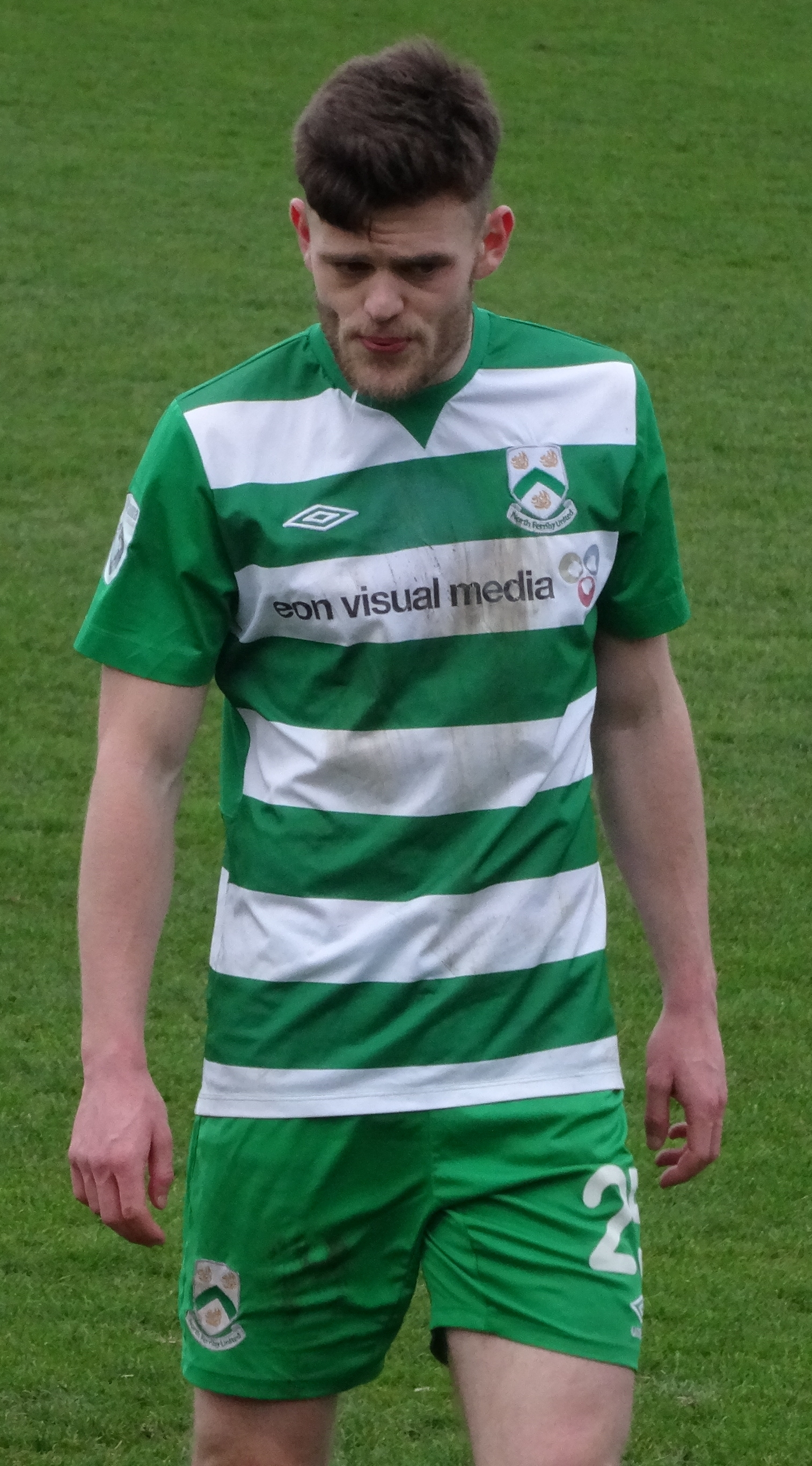
- Thompson playing for North Ferriby United in 2017

Personal information
- Full name: Reece Thompson
- Date of birth: 11 November 1993 (age 32)
- Place of birth: Worksop, England
- Height: 5 ft 9 in (1.74 m)
- Position: Striker

Youth career
- Retford United
- –2012: Lincoln City

Senior career*
Years	Team	Apps	(Gls)
2012	Lincoln City	0	(0)
2012–2014	Retford United		
2014–2015	Frickley Athletic	26	(9)
2015–2016	York City	14	(3)
2016–2017	North Ferriby United	38	(12)
2017–2019	Guiseley	18	(1)
2017–2018	→ Boston United (loan)	23	(9)
2020	Mickleover	3	(0)
2020	Wombwell Town	1	(0)
- * Club domestic league appearances and goals as of 19:13, 16 September 2021 (UTC)

Reece Thompson (born 11 November 1993) is an English former semi-professional footballer who played as a striker. He has played in the Football League for York City.

== Career ==
=== Early career ===
Born in Worksop, Nottinghamshire, Thompson started his career with Retford United's youth system, before he served his apprenticeship with Lincoln City during a three-year spell. He made one first-team appearance for Lincoln, as a substitute in a 3–1 away defeat to Carshalton Athletic on 18 January 2012 in the FA Trophy. Thompson was released by Lincoln before going on trial with Worksop Town, before he rejoined Retford later in 2012. He broke the record for goals scored in the under-19 league, with 32 goals from 18 appearances. He scored 14 goals from 20 matches with the first team from Christmas to the end of the 2012–13 season. He scored 39 goals in 2013–14.

Thompson joined Northern Premier League Premier Division club Frickley Athletic in October 2014, making his debut as a 90th-minute substitute in a 2–0 home victory over Belper Town on 18 October. His first goals came on 4 November 2015, after scoring twice in a 3–0 win over Stocksbridge Park Steels in the Sheffield & Hallamshire Senior Cup. He signed a contract with the club in November 2014 after scoring four goals from five starts. On 1 May 2015, Thompson scored twice as Frickley beat Nostell Miners Welfare 4–1 in the Sheffield & Hallamshire Senior Cup final, finishing 2014–15 with 15 goals from 32 matches. He was rewarded with a new two-year contract by Frickley.

=== York City ===
After a successful trial, Thompson signed for League Two club York City on 3 August 2015 for an undisclosed fee on a two-year contract. He made his debut in the opening match of 2015–16, a 3–0 away defeat to Wycombe Wanderers on 8 August 2015. On 2 September 2016, Thompson left York by mutual consent before joining their National League rivals North Ferriby United.

=== Return to non-league ===
Thompson scored 12 goals from 40 appearances for North Ferriby in 2016–17, as they were relegated to the National League North with a bottom-place finish in the National League.

Thompson signed for National League club Guiseley on 26 July 2017, with a fee to be decided by the Football Association unless Guiseley and North Ferriby could agree compensation. On 17 November 2017, he joined National League North club Boston United on loan until 1 January 2018. On 10 April 2019, Thompson's contract with Guiseley was terminated with immediate effect.

=== Post-prison career ===
In January 2020, Thompson signed for Mickleover but left the club after being sent back to prison a month later. On 26 August 2020, Thompson played as a trialist in a pre-season friendly for Selby Town, scoring twice against Tadcaster Albion. However, a day later, the club apologised for taking Thompson on trial, saying in a statement: "As a community football club we pride ourselves on being family friendly and as a club we take this very seriously. In this case a serious error of judgement was made and once again, we can only apologise for our mistake and make clear that the player in question will not be joining our squad now or in the future."

Thompson's former manager at Frickley Karl Rose signed him for his new amateur club Wombwell Town in October 2020. The club released a statement a week later stating that Thompson would not play again following the backlash the club had received for registering him.

== Prison sentence ==
On 3 April 2019, Thompson was sentenced to a 40-month custodial sentence along with a ten-year restraining order for domestic violence. He pleaded guilty to damaging property, assault occasioning actual bodily harm and inflicting grievous bodily harm to the victim over a three-day period when he appeared at Nottingham Crown Court.

In February 2020, a month after his release, Thompson was sent back to prison after posting a number of inappropriate tweets in relation to his conviction and because he spoke about the case to The Sun.

== Career statistics ==
As of 10 April 2019

Appearances and goals by club, season and competition
Club	Season	League			FA Cup		League Cup		Other		Total	
Club	Season	Division	Apps	Goals	Apps	Goals	Apps	Goals	Apps	Goals	Apps	Goals
Lincoln City	2011–12	Conference Premier	0	0	0	0	—		1 (Note: Appearance in FA Trophy)	0	1	0
Frickley Athletic	2014–15	Northern Premier League Premier Division	26	9	—		—		6 (Note: One appearance in FA Trophy, four appearances and five goals in Sheffield & Hallamshire Senior Cup, one appearance and one goal in Northern Premier League Challenge Cup)	6	32	15
York City	2015–16	League Two	13	3	0	0	2	0	1 (Note: Appearance in Football League Trophy)	0	16	3
York City	2016–17	National League	1	0	—		—		—		1	0
York City	Total		14	3	0	0	2	0	1	0	17	3
North Ferriby United	2016–17	National League	38	12	1	0	—		1	0	40	12
Guiseley	2017–18	National League	12	1	1	0	—		—		13	1
Guiseley	2018–19	National League North	6	0	0	0	—		0	0	6	0
Guiseley	Total		18	1	1	0	—		0	0	19	1
Boston United (loan)	2017–18	National League North	23	9	—		—		3 (Note: One appearance in Lincolnshire Senior Cup and two goals, two appearances in FA Trophy)	2	26	11
Career total			119	34	2	0	2	0	12	8	135	42

== Honours ==
Frickley Athletic

- Sheffield & Hallamshire Senior Cup: 2014–15
