= 2015–16 York City F.C. season =

Association football club season

York City F.C.
2015–16 season
- Chairman: Jason McGill
- Manager: Russ Wilcox (until 26 October 2015); Richard Cresswell (caretaker, from 26 October 2015 to 4 November 2015); Jackie McNamara (from 4 November 2015)
- Ground: Bootham Crescent
- League Two: 24th (relegated)
- FA Cup: First round (eliminated by Accrington Stanley)
- League Cup: Second round (eliminated by Swansea City)
- Football League Trophy: Northern section quarter-final (eliminated by Barnsley)
- Top goalscorer: League: Bradley Fewster (8); All: Vadaine Oliver (10)
- Highest home attendance: 4,890 vs Hartlepool United, League Two, 15 August 2015
- Lowest home attendance: 1,627 vs Doncaster Rovers, Football League Trophy, 6 October 2015
- Average home league attendance: 3,218
Home colours	Away colours	Third colours

The 2015–16 season was the 94th season of competitive association football and 79th season in the Football League played by York City Football Club, a professional football club based in York, North Yorkshire, England. Their 18th-place finish in 2014–15 meant it was their fourth successive season in League Two. The 2015–16 season ran from 1 July 2015 to 30 June 2016.

Russ Wilcox made six permanent summer signings, as he approached his first full season as York manager. In October 2015, Wilcox was dismissed with York 21st in the table, following a nine-match run without a win. He was replaced by former Dundee United manager Jackie McNamara in November 2015. However, York never ranked higher than 22nd place under McNamara, and were relegated into the National League after finishing bottom of the 24-team 2015–16 League Two. They lost in their opening round match in the 2015–16 FA Cup, and were eliminated in the second round of the League Cup and the Northern section quarter-final of the Football League Trophy.

42 players made at least one appearance in nationally organised first-team competition, and there were 18 different goalscorers. Goalkeeper Scott Flinders missed only three of the 51 first-team matches over the season. Vadaine Oliver finished as leading scorer with 10 goals, of which seven came in league competition, one came in the FA Cup and two came in the Football League Trophy. The winner of the Clubman of the Year award, voted for by the club's supporters, was defender Dave Winfield.

== Background and pre-season ==
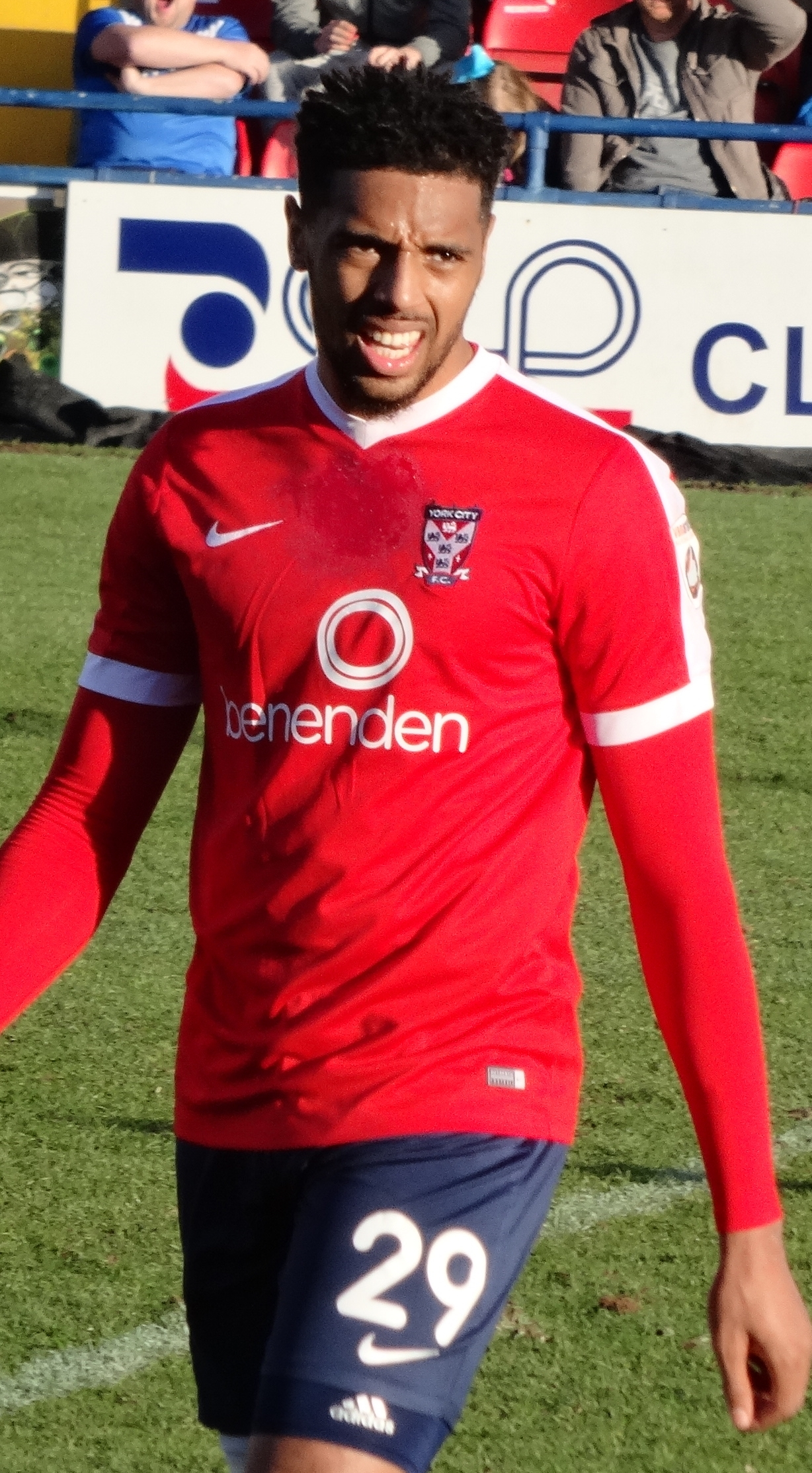
Vadaine Oliver, who signed from Crewe Alexandra in the summer, was York City's top scorer with 10 goals.

The 2014–15 season was Nigel Worthington's second start to a season as manager of York City, having taken charge in March 2013. Worthington resigned in October 2014 with York one place above the relegation zone. He was replaced by Russ Wilcox, who had led Scunthorpe United to promotion from League Two last season before being dismissed with them struggling in League One. York secured safety from relegation with more than two weeks of the season remaining, and finished in 18th place in the 2014–15 League Two table.

Ahead of 2015–16, York released Wes Fletcher, Ryan Jarvis, Lewis Montrose and Daniel Parslow, while Jason Mooney left for Accrington Stanley. Josh Carson, Michael Ingham and Tom Platt were retained with new contracts. York made nine summer signings, those being goalkeeper Scott Flinders from Hartlepool United, defenders Taron Hare and Eddie Nolan from Scunthorpe United, George Swan from Wolverhampton Wanderers, David Tutonda on loan from Cardiff City and Stéphane Zubar on loan from AFC Bournemouth, midfielder James Berrett from Yeovil Town, and strikers Vadaine Oliver from Crewe Alexandra and Reece Thompson from Frickley Athletic. Midfielder Callum Rzonca entered the first-team squad from the youth team after agreeing a professional contract.

New home and away kits were introduced for the second successive summer. The home kit included red shirts with a navy blue diagonal stripe, red shorts and red socks. The away kits featured black shirts with yellow trims on each shoulder and on each side, black shorts with yellow trims on each side and block socks. Benenden Health continued as shirt sponsors for the fourth successive season.

Pre-season match details
Date	Opponents	Venue	Result	Score F–A	Scorers	Attendance	Ref.
11 July 2015	Middlesbrough	H	L	0–1		2,798	
15 July 2015	Leeds United	H	D	1–1	McCoy 80'	4,348	
18 July 2015	Sheffield Wednesday	H	D	1–1	McCoy 32'	2,904	
25 July 2015	Harrogate Town	A	L	0–2		580	
27 July 2015	Darlington 1883	A	D	1–1	Mohamed (Note: Trialist)	344	
29 July 2015	Newcastle United	H	W	2–1	Straker 16', Thompson 19'	5,406	
1 August 2015	FC Halifax Town	A	L	0–2		678	

== Review ==
=== August ===
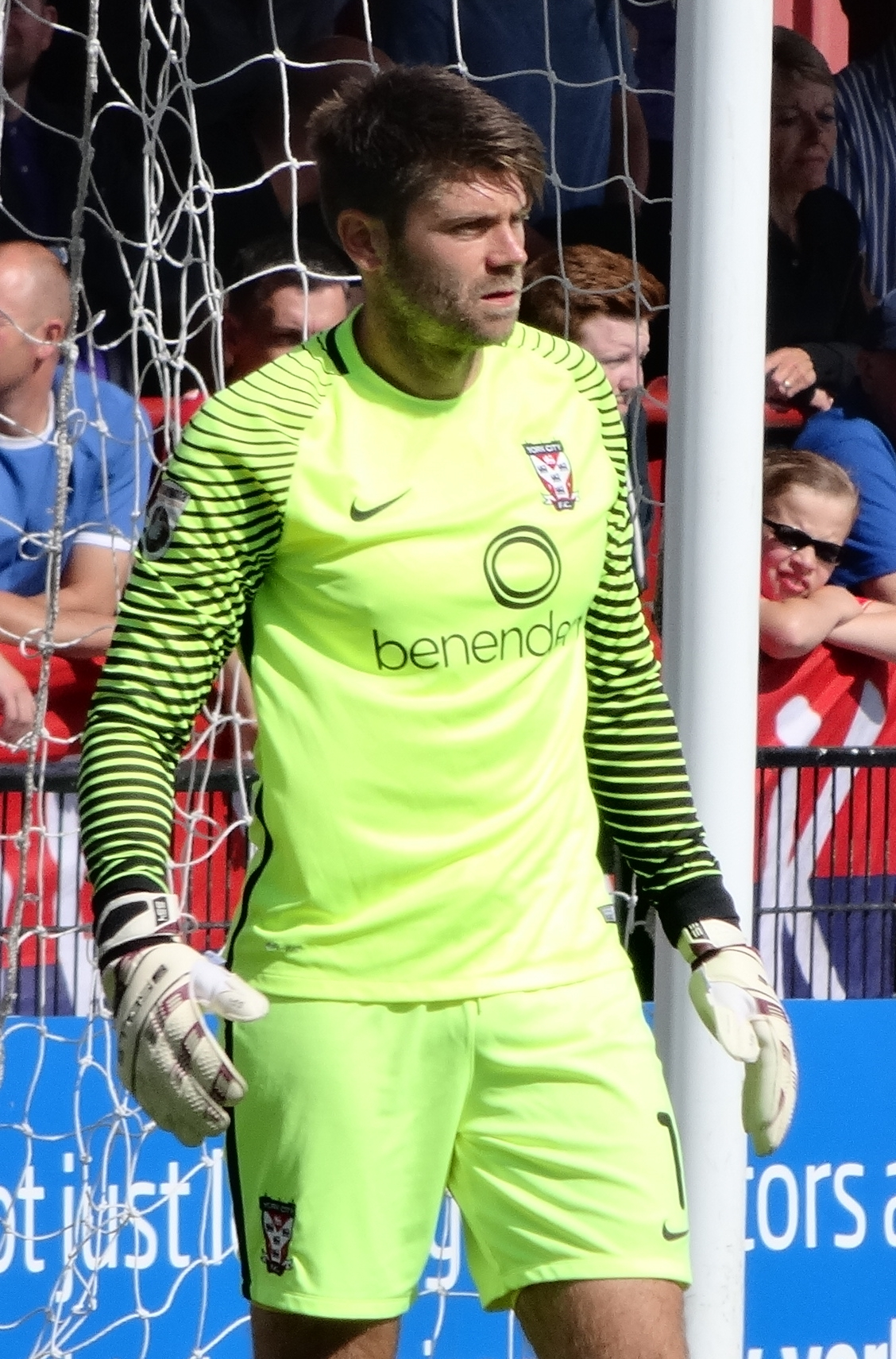
Scott Flinders saved two penalties in York City's penalty shoot-out win over Bradford City in the League Cup.

York's first match was away to last season's League Two play-off finalists, Wycombe Wanderers, which they lost 3–0. Anthony Stewart opened the scoring with a header before Aaron Amadi-Holloway scored from a low shot, and Zubar scored an own goal when his attempted back-pass lobbed Flinders. York then played League One team Bradford City at home in the first round of the League Cup, and the visitors took the lead in the first half through a Christopher Routis volley. Luke Summerfield equalised with a penalty in the 49th minute, and after Bradford missed a penalty 20 minutes from time, Berrett scored a free kick in the 85th minute. James Hanson headed an equaliser for Bradford in stoppage time, and the match ended 2–2 after extra time. York won the penalty shoot-out 4–2, and Flinders saved two penalties before Carson scored the winning spot kick. York lost 2–1 to Hartlepool United in their first home league match of the season, despite taking the lead in the 57th minute when Thompson scored after Hartlepool failed to clear Summerfield's cross. Billy Paynter curled a shot into the top corner before Michael Woods scored the winner for Hartlepool in the 81st minute, after his miskicked shot took a touch off Berrett.

York picked up their first points of the season after they beat Yeovil Town 1–0 at home, in which Berrett scored in the 63rd minute with a deflected 20-yard shot. This was followed by a 0–0 away draw with Exeter City, in which Zubar was carried off injured. Following the match, Lindon Meikle was released by mutual consent, having failed to make a matchday squad in the first five matches of the season. York were beaten 3–0 away by Swansea City of the Premier League in the League Cup third round, with Nathan Dyer, Matt Grimes and Marvin Emnes scoring their goals. Zubar returned to Bournemouth after he suffered cruciate ligament damage during the Exeter match. Platt was loaned to National League North team Harrogate Town for three months. Thompson gave York a sixth-minute lead with a close-range finish in a home match against Mansfield Town. The away team scored twice later in the first half through Matt Green, and York lost the match 2–1.

=== September ===
York achieved their first away win of the season after beating bottom-of-the-table Newport County 3–0. Berrett opened the scoring in the first half with a shot into the bottom corner, and in the second half Thompson scored a header before Oliver scored with a close-range finish. York drew 2–2 away to Stevenage, and took the lead in the 39th minute with a Nolan shot from the edge of the penalty area. Chris Whelpdale and Charlie Lee scored for Stevenage in quick succession early in the second half, and Summerfield equalised with a curling shot on 74 minutes, before Flinders saved a late Brett Williams penalty. Striker Rhys Turner joined on a one-month loan from Oldham Athletic, and made his debut in York's 2–2 home draw with Carlisle United. York were 2–0 down at half-time, before Oliver was sent off for an off-the-ball incident early in the second half. However, within a two-minute period, Summerfield scored a penalty and Carson converted an Emile Sinclair cross to bring the score to 2–2.

York were beaten 1–0 away by Notts County, whose goal came in the 12th minute when Izale McLeod capitalised on a mistake by Flinders. Platt was recalled from his loan at Harrogate, where he made six appearances, after Summerfield sustained back and head injuries in the match against Notts County. York lost 2–1 at home to Oxford United; having gone behind, Turner scored an equaliser after confusion between Sam Slocombe and Johnny Mullins in the penalty area, but the away team scored the winning goal in the second half. Striker Ben Hirst went on a one-month loan to Northern Premier League Division One North club Scarborough Athletic, having had limited chances in the team.

=== October ===
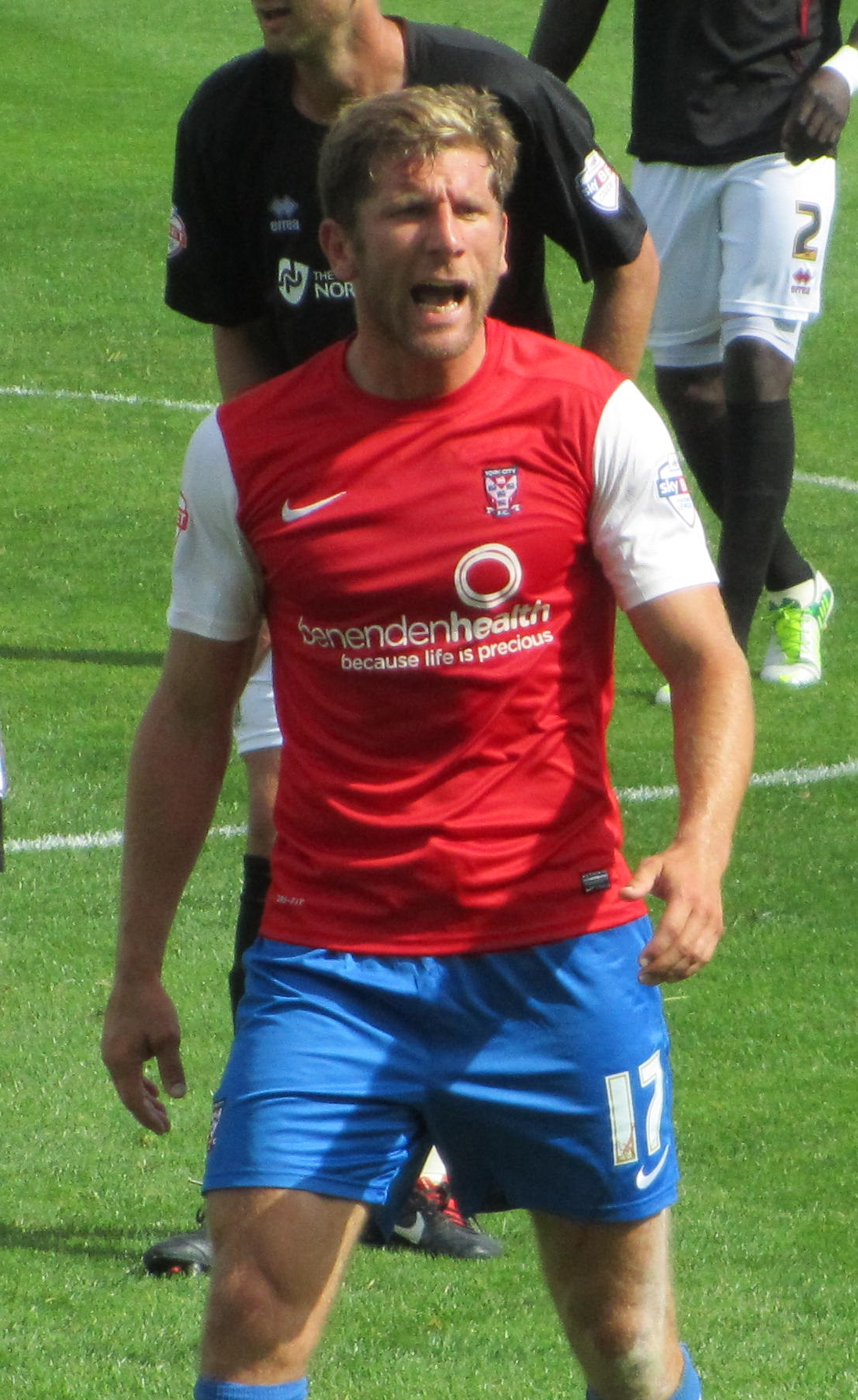
Richard Cresswell took over as caretaker manager after Russ Wilcox was dismissed, ...

Midfielder Michael Collins joined on a one-month loan from Oxford, as cover for the injured Nolan and Summerfield. Michael Coulson scored with a low shot to give York a 50th-minute lead at home to Cambridge United, and John McCombe scored four minutes later with a curling shot to make the score 2–0. However, Mark Roberts and Barry Corr scored for Cambridge in the last 19 minutes, and the match finished a 2–2 draw. York knocked League One team Doncaster Rovers out of the Football League Trophy in the second round with a 2–0 home win. Oliver gave York an early lead with a header into the bottom corner from an Anthony Straker cross, and he doubled the lead early into the second half; after dispossessing Aaron Taylor-Sinclair he lifted the ball over the advancing goalkeeper, Thorsten Stuckmann, before hitting the ball into an empty net. York ended Luton Town's four-match winning streak with a 1–1 away draw; Lowe scored late into the first half with a shot into the top of the goal, before Luton equalised in the second half from a Cameron McGeehan penalty. Turner's loan was extended for a second month. York were beaten 3–1 away by Barnet, who had been on a three-match losing streak. After going behind to John Akinde's goal, Coulson equalised for York in the 80th minute with a drilled shot, but goals in the last 10 minutes from Michael Gash and Josh Clarke secured a win for the home team.

Oliver scored a tap-in to give York a 14th-minute lead at home to Dagenham & Redbridge, before the away team equalised through Ashley Hemmings later in the first half. Jamie Cureton gave Dagenham the lead early in the second half before Coulson scored with a curling shot from 20 yards on 79 minutes, the match finishing a 2–2 draw. York lost 3–1 at home to AFC Wimbledon, who took the lead in the first half through Ade Azeez before Oliver equalised with a bicycle kick in the 60th minute. Lyle Taylor and Tom Elliott scored later in the second half to secure AFC Wimbledon's first successive win of 2015. Wilcox and his assistant John Schofield were dismissed with York 21st in the table after a run of nine matches without a win. First-team coach Richard Cresswell took over as caretaker manager, assisted by youth-team coach Jonathan Greening and goalkeeping coach Andy Leaning. Middlesbrough midfielder Bryn Morris, an England youth international, was signed on a one-month loan, and Collins' loan was extended for a second month. Cresswell's first match in charge was a 1–0 away defeat to Crawley Town, who scored in the 86th minute with a Simon Walton penalty.

=== November ===
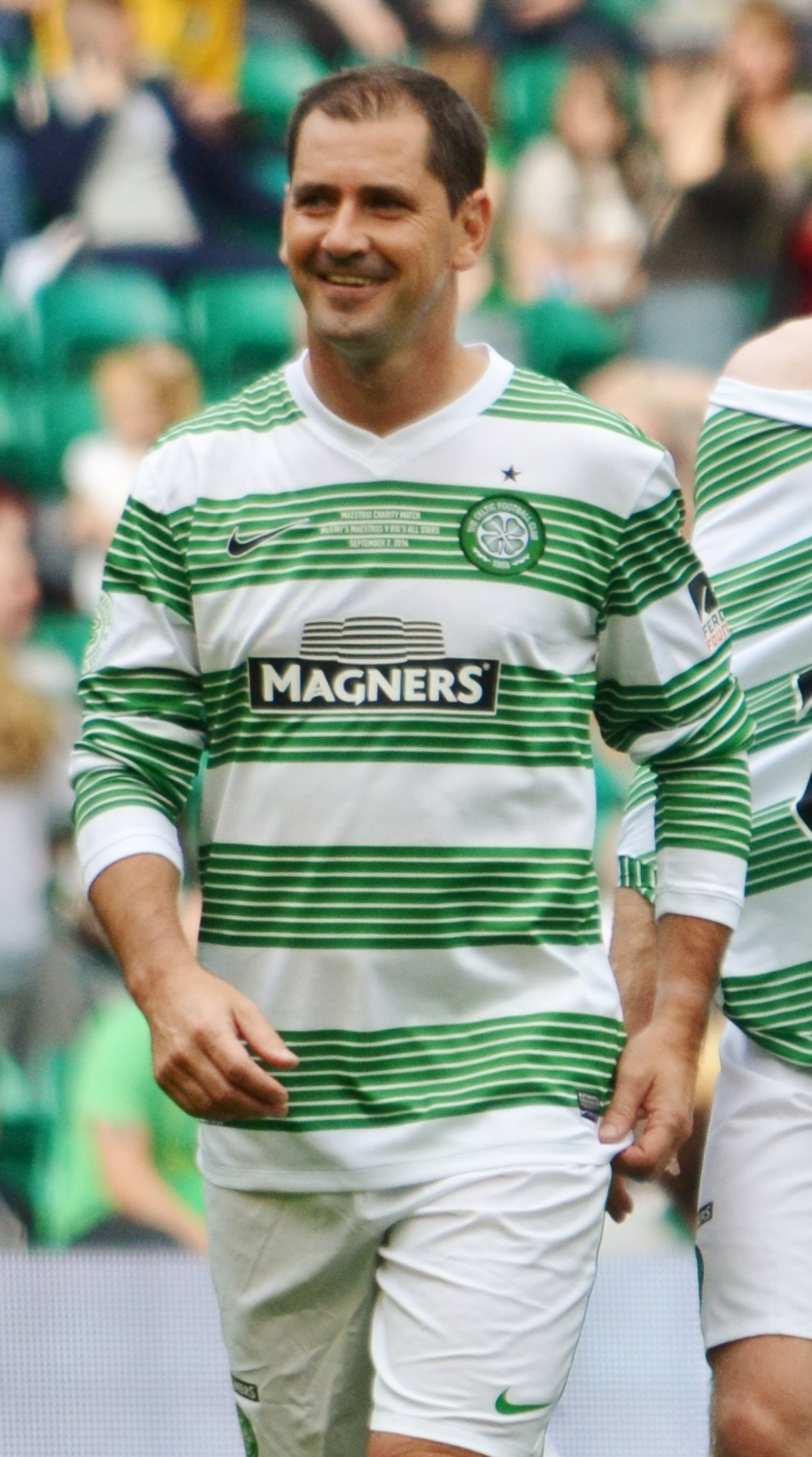
... before Jackie McNamara, who previously managed Dundee United, was appointed.

Former Dundee United manager Jackie McNamara was appointed as Wilcox's successor, with Simon Donnelly joining as his assistant. McNamara's first match in charge was a 3–2 away defeat in the FA Cup first round to Accrington Stanley, who took the lead on 29 minutes through Sean McConville, before Oliver equalised for York five minutes later with a close-range finish. Matt Crooks put Accrington back in front two minutes later and Josh Windass scored a penalty early into the second half, before Coulson scored a consolation goal for York with a stoppage time header. York were eliminated from the Football League Trophy after being beaten 2–1 away by Barnsley in the Northern section quarter-final. Coulson opened the scoring for York on 40 minutes with a free kick into the top-left corner, before the League One team scored in the second half through Ben Pearson and Adam Hammill. Greening, who began his career at the club, registered as a player on non-contract terms aged 36, to provide cover with a number of midfielders unavailable. York were beaten 2–1 at home by league leaders Plymouth Argyle, who were two goals up by half-time with goals from Jake Jervis and Graham Carey. Dave Winfield was stretchered off with his neck in a brace during the second half, and Ben Godfrey scored a consolation goal for York during the 10 minutes of stoppage time that followed. Defender Will Boyle, the Huddersfield Town under-21 captain, was signed on a youth loan until January 2016.

York were beaten 3–2 away by Leyton Orient, who took a two-goal lead through Mathieu Baudry and Jay Simpson before Oliver equalised in first-half stoppage time. Orient restored their two-goal advantage through Simpson in the second half, and Oliver scored a consolation goal with a header in the 86th minute. York were beaten 6–0 away by Portsmouth, in which Greening was sent off before half-time for catching Michael Doyle with his elbow, before Ben Davies and Marc McNulty gave the home team the lead early in the second half. McNulty scored two more goals before Ben Tollitt and Conor Chaplin finished the scoring for Portsmouth; this result saw York drop into the relegation zone for the first time in 2015–16. York signed five players before the deadline for loan transfers: defenders Mark Kitching from Middlesbrough and Stefan O'Connor from Arsenal, midfielders Jordan Lussey from Bolton Wanderers and Kenny McEvoy from Tottenham Hotspur, and striker Bradley Fewster from Middlesbrough. Winger Danny Galbraith, released by Gillingham at the end of last season, was signed before the deadline for free transfers. Collins, Morris, Turner and Tutonda were sent back to their parent clubs. York suffered another heavy defeat after losing 5–1 at home to Accrington, who were two goals up at half-time with goals from Matty Pearson and Billy Kee. Josh Windass scored a penalty for Accrington after O'Connor tripped Tom Davies, and Kee scored their fourth before Fewster scored for York with a shot into the bottom corner on 75 minutes. Shay McCartan finished the scoring for Accrington late into the match, and the result meant York equalled a club record of eight straight defeats.

=== December ===
Lowe left the club by mutual consent, having earlier been made available for loan by McNamara. Goalkeeping coach Andy Leaning left the club, and was replaced by Craig Hinchliffe, who worked with McNamara at Dundee United. Lussey's loan came to a premature end, after he tore a muscle. York dropped to the bottom of the table after being beaten 2–1 away by Bristol Rovers, in which they took the lead on 41 minutes with an eight-yard volley scored by Oliver. Jermaine Easter equalised for Rovers on 71 minutes, before Matty Taylor scored their winning goal in stoppage time. Cresswell and Greening left the club by mutual consent, while Steve Torpey returned as youth-team coach. York won for the first time in 10 matches after beating Morecambe 2–1 at home, which saw them move out of the relegation zone. Winfield opened the scoring with a header from Berrett's cross on 38 minutes, and Berrett doubled the lead in the 52nd minute with a low shot from the edge of the penalty area, before Jamie Devitt scored a consolation goal for Morecambe two minutes later. York drew 1–1 away to Mansfield, taking the lead on 10 minutes when Winfield touched in Summerfield's free kick, before the home team equalised later in the first half through Krystian Pearce.

=== January ===
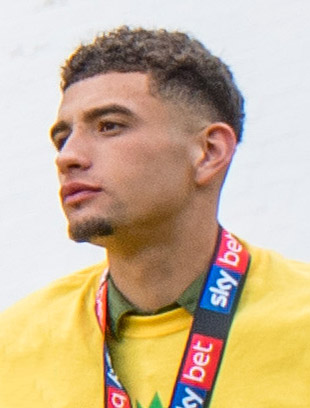
Ben Godfrey was sold to Premier League club Norwich City for an undisclosed fee.

York dropped to the bottom of the table after being beaten 1–0 away by Yeovil, who in turn moved above York; their goal came from a Matthew Dolan penalty scored late in the first half. Fewster's loan was extended to the end of the season, while McEvoy was signed permanently for the rest of 2015–16. Burnley right-back Luke Hendrie and Newcastle United centre-back Kyle Cameron were signed on one-month loans, while Ntumba Massanka joined on loan from Burnley until the end of the season. Godfrey joined Premier League club Norwich City for an undisclosed fee, believed to be £150,000, with further clauses that could take the figure to £1 million if met. The money was to be invested on strengthening the team, and York immediately replaced Godfrey with Hull City midfielder Matty Dixon, who signed a one-and-a-half-year contract on a free transfer. York lost 1–0 at home to fellow strugglers Newport, who had only appointed their manager Warren Feeney a day earlier. The loss came after Aaron Collins scored in the eighth minute. Marvin McCoy and Straker left the club by mutual consent, while McCombe and Nolan were also offered severance packages.

York drew 1–1 away with Carlisle, who took the lead early in the first half through Jason Kennedy, before Summerfield equalised for York on 87 minutes after Fewster's shot hit the post. Nolan left by mutual consent, before Hendrie had his loan extended to the end of the season. Platt returned to Harrogate on a one-month loan, while Ľubomír Šatka, a Slovakia under-21 international, joined one a one-month youth loan from Newcastle. Former Scotland international striker Derek Riordan, who last played for East Fife, was signed on a contract until the end of the season, after impressing during a two-week trial. York moved within three points of safety after beating Stevenage 2–1 at home, McEvoy scoring the opening goal in the 15th minute with a shot from 12 yards. Keith Keane scored an equaliser for Stevenage on 78 minutes, before Galbraith scored the winning goal in the third minute of stoppage time, with a low shot in off the post from the edge of the penalty area.

=== February ===
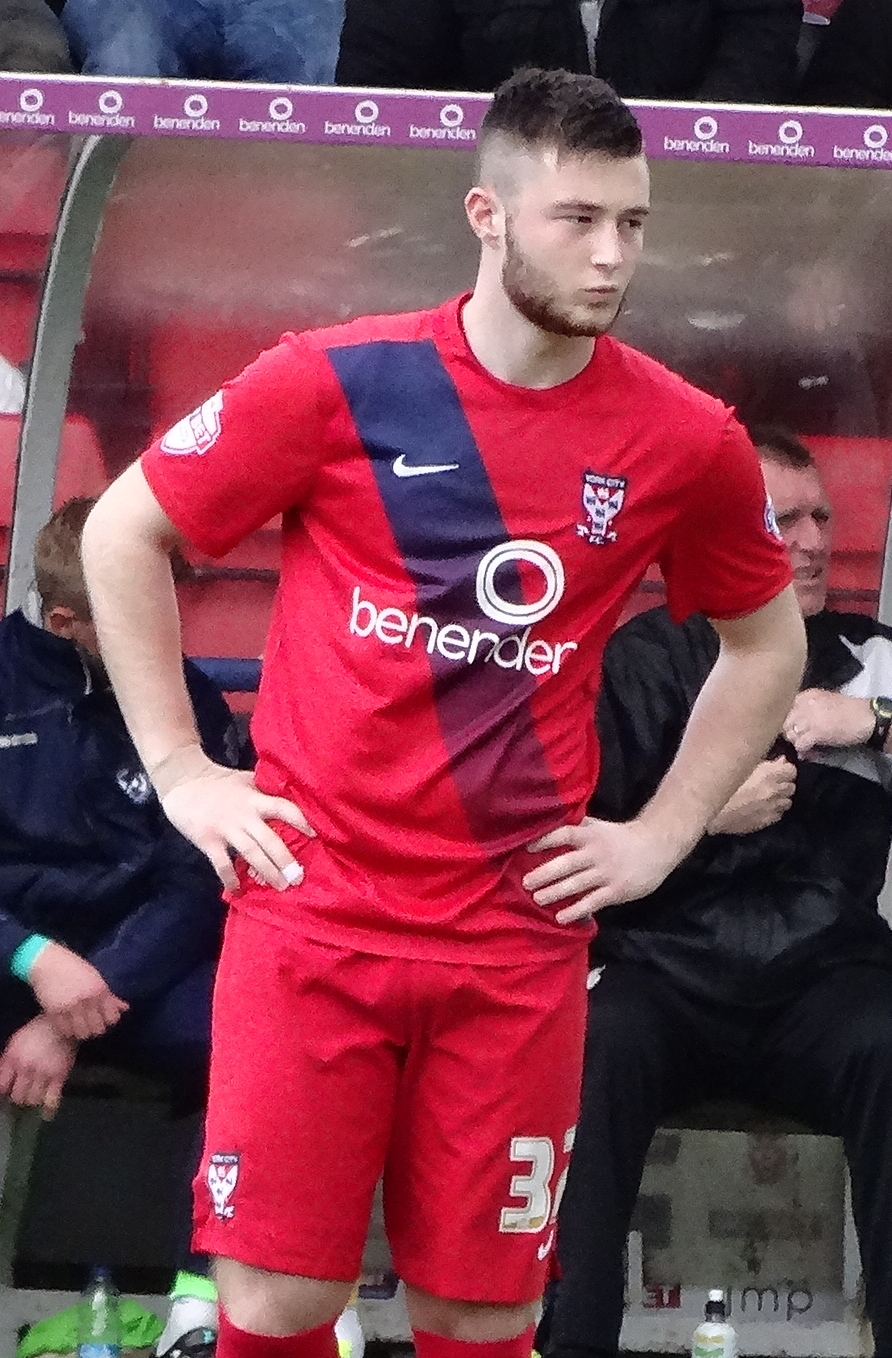
Bradley Fewster was named the League Two Player of the Month for February 2016.

On transfer deadline day, McCombe left the club after agreeing a severance package, and Sinclair joined National League club Guiseley on a one-month loan. York lost 2–0 away to top-of-the-table Northampton Town, who scored in each half through John-Joe O'Toole and Marc Richards, and had Hendrie sent off for a foul on Ricky Holmes. Cameron's loan was extended until the end of the season, having impressed in his four starts for the club. York won successive home wins for the first time in 2015–16 after they beat Notts County 2–1, a result that saw them move off the bottom of the table into 23rd place. Coulson opened the scoring on 24 minutes after lobbing goalkeeper Roy Carroll from 15 yards before Fewster scored from close range from McEvoy's cross in the 39th minute. County recorded a consolation goal after Šatka scored an own goal in the second half. York moved out of the relegation into 22nd place with a 2–0 home win over Exeter, and in doing so ended the club's longest run without a clean sheet since 1967, after 23 matches. Fewster scored both goals, the first in the 35th minute with a low shot at close range from Coulson's pass, and the second in the 64th minute with a shot from the edge of the penalty area.

York's two-match winning run came to an end after being beaten 3–1 away by Cambridge, who had taken a two-goal lead by the 26th minute through Jimmy Spencer and Josh Coulson. Berrett scored for York seven minutes later with a long-range shot into the top-left corner, before Ben Williamson finished the scoring for Cambridge in the second half. York dropped back into the relegation zone in 23rd place after losing 2–1 at home to Northampton, who took the lead late in the first half through James Collins. John Marquis doubled Northampton's lead early into the second half, and Russell Penn scored a consolation goal for York with a 25-yard dipping volley in the third minute of stoppage time. Huddersfield's Boyle rejoined on loan until the end of the season, while Hare was loaned out to Northern Premier League Premier Division club Stamford for one month. York were beaten 3–2 at home by Luton, Cameron McGeehan giving the visitors the lead early in the second half before Fewster equalised in the 62nd minute after rounding goalkeeper Mark Tyler. After Jack Marriott restored Luton's lead, Fewster scored York's second goal on 82 minutes before Olly Lee scored a solo goal to win the match for the visitors in stoppage time. Šatka's loan from Newcastle was extended to the end of the season. Fewster was named the League Two Player of the Month for February 2016, having scored five goals over the month.

=== March ===
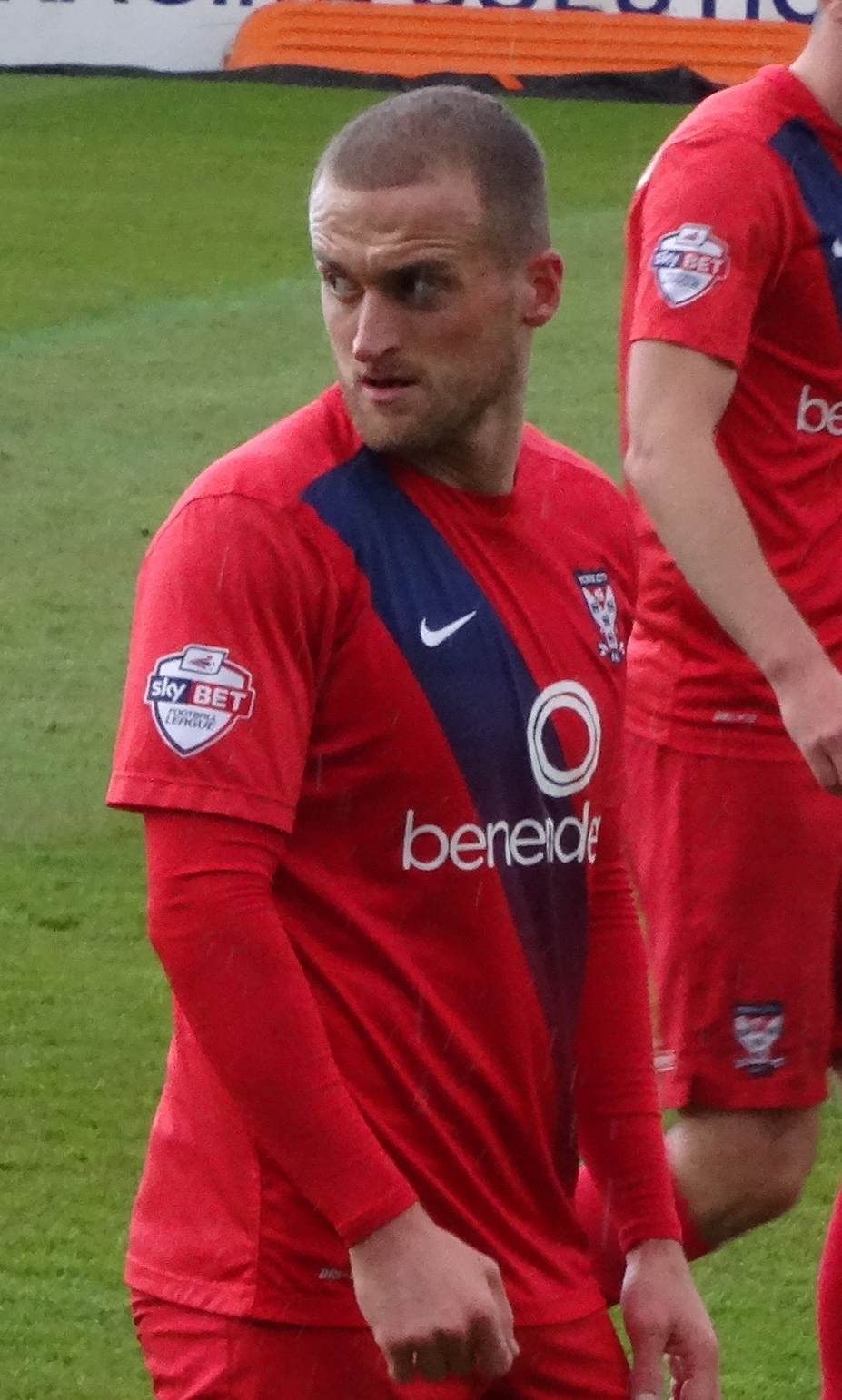
Lewis Alessandra joined on loan from Oldham Athletic.

York lost 4–0 away to third-place Oxford, in what was only their first home league win of 2016, with a first-half goal from Jordan Bowery and second-half goals from Chey Dunkley, Danny Hylton and Kemar Roofe. Platt and Sinclair's respective loans at Harrogate and Guiseley were extended for a further month. York were beaten 1–0 away by bottom-of-the-table Dagenham, which meant they moved to within two points of York. Penn was sent off in the 57th minute for handling the ball on the goal line, and the resulting Joss Labadie penalty was saved by Flinders, before Dagenham scored the only goal through Josh Passley on 78 minutes. York signed Rochdale striker Lewis Alessandra on a one-month emergency loan and Notts County defender Scot Bennett on loan for the rest of 2015–16, while Massanka was recalled by Burnley. The team drew 1–1 at home with Barnet, which combined with Hartlepool's win over Dagenham meant York were seven points adrift of safety. Alessandra gave York the lead 20 minutes into his debut with a shot from 10 yards after Jake Hyde hit the post, before Barnet equalised shortly before half-time through Akinde. Rzonca joined Stamford on a one-month loan, with Hare's loan at the club extended to the end of the season.

York were beaten 2–1 away by AFC Wimbledon, and they took the lead in the 38th minute when Penn rebounded in Oliver's blocked shot. Rhys Murphy equalised for AFC Wimbledon on 68 minutes, before Jake Reeves scored with a 30-yard volley in the third minute of stoppage time. Platt's contract with York was terminated by mutual consent, allowing him to join Harrogate permanently. York remained seven points adrift of safety with a 2–2 draw at home to Crawley, who took the lead on five minutes through Matt Harrold before Summerfield equalised for York with a 30th-minute penalty after Alessandra was fouled by Jon Ashton in the penalty area. Liam McAlinden put Crawley back in the lead on 48 minutes, before Coulson scored York's equaliser with a curling 15-yard shot in the 69th minute. York had fallen three goals behind away to promotion-chasing Plymouth by the 42nd minute of a 3–2 defeat, who scored through Jamille Matt, Reuben Reid and a Boyle own goal. Penn brought York back into the match with a drilled shot on 52 minutes, before Summerfield scored a penalty in the 86th minute.

=== April and May ===
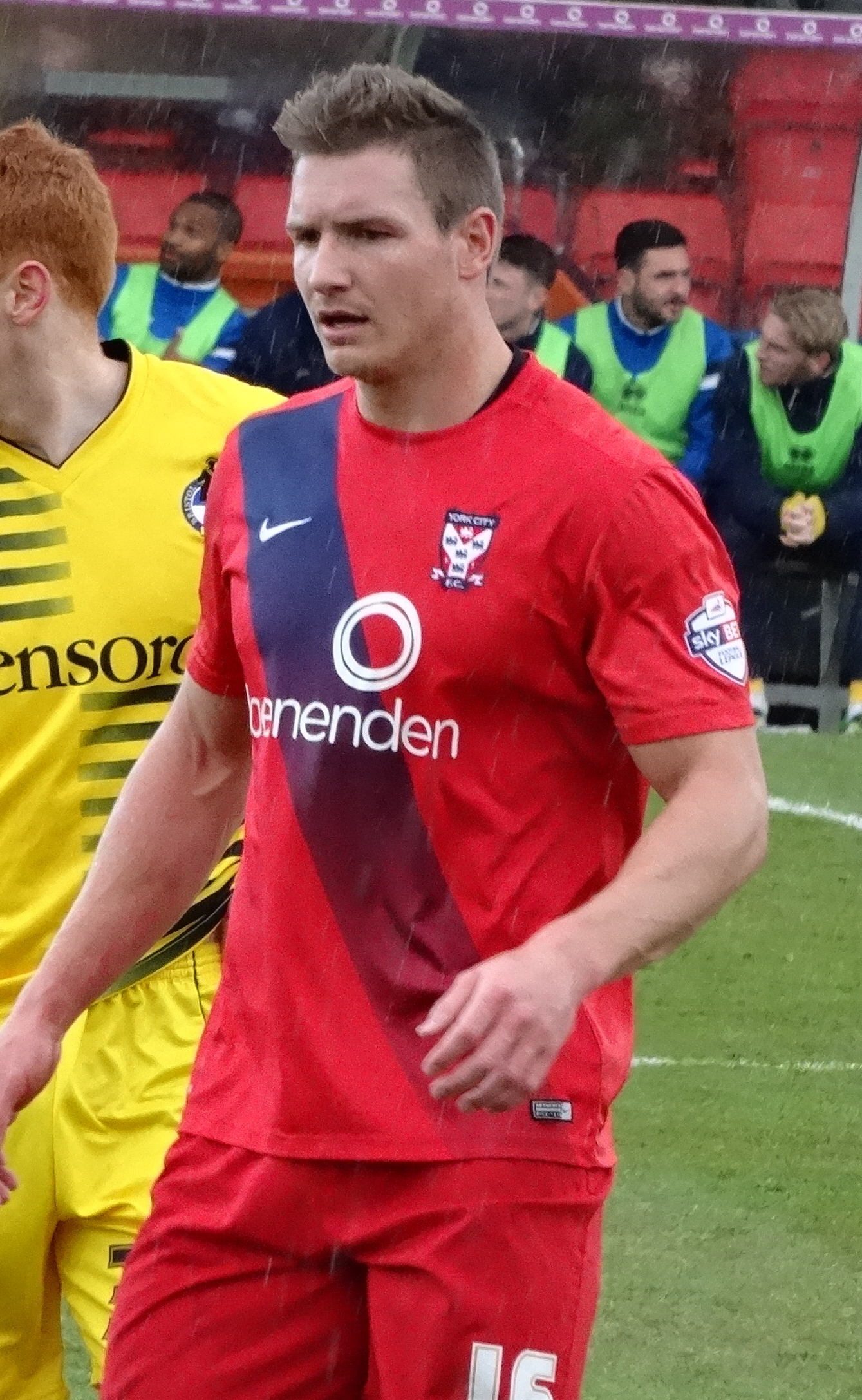
Dave Winfield was voted Clubman of the Year for 2015–16.

York moved to being nine points from safety after drawing 1–1 at home to Orient, in which York took the lead in the 17th minute when Fewster converted Summerfield's cross from three yards. Boyle was sent off on 74 minutes after receiving a second yellow card for diving, before Orient equalised a minute later through Lloyd James. Sinclair's loan at Guiseley was extended to the end of the season. York moved closer to relegation after a 1–1 home draw with Wycombe, which left them nine points from safety with five fixtures remaining. York took the lead when Oliver scored his first goal since December 2015 with a 10-yard shot into bottom corner on 35 minutes, before Matt Bloomfield equalised for Wycombe in the 88th minute. Alessandra's loan was extended to the end of the season, after scoring once in six appearances. York were left on the verge of relegation from League Two after a 2–1 away defeat to Hartlepool, with the team 11 points adrift of safety with four fixtures remaining. York went behind on 24 minutes to Nathan Thomas's goal, and 11 minutes later Winfield was sent off for a second yellow card. Cameron equalised for York in first-half stoppage time with a header from Summerfield's corner, before Michael Woods scored Hartlepool's winning goal on 72 minutes.

York won for the first time in 13 matches after beating Portsmouth 3–1 at home, but were left nine points adrift of safety with three matches remaining. Fewster headed York into the lead on 30 minutes and Alessandra scored with a low shot four minutes later. Summerfield made it 3–0 three minutes after half-time with a 30-yard shot, before Portsmouth scored a consolation goal through Gareth Evans in the 55th minute. York's relegation into the National League was confirmed after a 3–0 away defeat to Accrington, marking the end of a four-year spell in the Football League. Promotion-chasing Accrington opened the scoring in the first half through Tariqe Fosu, before Josh Windass scored twice in the second half. York were beaten 4–1 by promotion-chasing Bristol Rovers in their last home match of the season, dropping to the bottom of the table as a result. Billy Bodin scored Rovers' first two goals before Jermaine Easter and Lee Mansell scored either side of McEvoy's 81st-minute goal, a close-range finish from Fewster's low cross from the left. Before the match, Winfield was named the 2015–16 Clubman of the Year, voted for by the club's supporters. York's last match of the season was a 1–1 away draw with Morecambe, in which they took the lead after Summerfield scored in first-half stoppage time, before the home team equalised through Jamie Devitt. This meant York's final league position in 2015–16 was bottom place, being relegated alongside 23rd-place Dagenham.

== Summary and aftermath ==
York released Carson, Hare, Hirst, Femi Ilesanmi, McEvoy, Riordan, Sinclair and Swan after the season ended. Berrett, Coulson, Hyde and Penn left to join Grimsby Town, St Johnstone, Stevenage and Carlisle respectively, while Ingham, Summerfield and Winfield rejected new contracts. Galbraith and Rzonca signed new contracts with the club. York's summer signings included goalkeeper Luke Simpson from Watford, defenders Ben Barber from Stoke City, Ben Clappison from Hull, Matt Fry from Braintree Town, Jack Higgins from Stalybridge Celtic, Lanre Oyebanjo from Crawley, Josh Robinson from Crusaders, Shaun Rooney from Dunfermline Athletic and Alex Whittle from Southport, midfielders Franklyn Clarke from Dorchester Town, Simon Heslop from Wrexham, Clovis Kamdjo from Forest Green Rovers Yan Klukowski from Newport and Charlie Wardle from Northwich Manchester Villa, wingers Aidan Connolly from Raith Rovers, Kaine Felix and Boston United and Daniel Nti from Worcester City, and strikers Richard Brodie from Stockport County and Scott Fenwick from Hartlepool. Midfielder Tyler Walton and striker Nick Kennedy joined the first-team squad from the youth team after signing professional contracts with the club.

== Match details ==
=== League Two ===
League Two match details
Date	League position	Opponents	Venue	Result	Score F–A	Scorers	Attendance	Ref.
8 August 2015	24th	Wycombe Wanderers	A	L	0–3		3,688	
15 August 2015	22nd	Hartlepool United	H	L	1–2	Thompson 57'	4,890	
18 August 2015	17th	Yeovil Town	H	W	1–0	Berrett 63'	2,849	
22 August 2015	18th	Exeter City	A	D	0–0		3,139	
29 August 2015	19th	Mansfield Town	H	L	1–2	Thompson 6'	3,215	
5 September 2015	17th	Newport County	A	W	3–0	Berrett 38', Thompson 55', Oliver 59'	2,459	
12 September 2015	17th	Stevenage	A	D	2–2	Nolan 39', Summerfield 74'	3,319	
19 September 2015	16th	Carlisle United	H	D	2–2	Summerfield 72' pen., Carson 74'	3,692	
26 September 2015	19th	Notts County	A	L	0–1		5,159	
29 September 2015	19th	Oxford United	H	L	1–2	Turner 38'	2,791	
3 October 2015	18th	Cambridge United	H	D	2–2	Coulson 50', McCombe 54'	2,987	
10 October 2015	19th	Luton Town	A	D	1–1	Lowe 38'	8,618	
17 October 2015	21st	Barnet	A	L	1–3	Coulson 80'	1,767	
20 October 2015	21st	Dagenham & Redbridge	H	D	2–2	Oliver 14', Coulson 79'	2,559	
24 October 2015	21st	AFC Wimbledon	H	L	1–3	Oliver 60'	3,000	
31 October 2015	22nd	Crawley Town	A	L	0–1		1,950	
14 November 2015	22nd	Plymouth Argyle	H	L	1–2	Godfrey 90+9'	3,654	
21 November 2015	22nd	Leyton Orient	A	L	2–3	Oliver 45+2', 86'	4,897	
24 November 2015	23rd	Portsmouth	A	L	0–6		13,616	
28 November 2015	23rd	Accrington Stanley	H	L	1–5	Fewster 75'	2,825	
12 December 2015	24th	Bristol Rovers	A	L	1–2	Oliver 41'	6,916	
19 December 2015	22nd	Morecambe	H	W	2–1	Winfield 38', Berrett 52'	2,769	
28 December 2015	22nd	Mansfield Town	A	D	1–1	Winfield 10'	3,958	
2 January 2016	24th	Yeovil Town	A	L	0–1		3,866	
16 January 2016	24th	Newport County	H	L	0–1		2,923	
23 January 2016	24th	Carlisle United	A	D	1–1	Summerfield 87'	7,461	
30 January 2016	24th	Stevenage	H	W	2–1	McEvoy 15', Galbraith 90+3'	2,951	
6 February 2016	24th	Northampton Town	A	L	0–2		5,342	
13 February 2016	23rd	Notts County	H	W	2–1	Coulson 24', Fewster 39'	3,811	
16 February 2016	22nd	Exeter City	H	W	2–0	Fewster (2) 35', 64'	2,920	
20 February 2016	22nd	Cambridge United	A	L	1–3	Berrett 33'	4,822	
23 February 2016	23rd	Northampton Town	H	L	1–2	Penn 90+3'	2,887	
27 February 2016	23rd	Luton Town	H	L	2–3	Fewster (2) 62', 82'	3,628	
1 March 2016	23rd	Oxford United	A	L	0–4		5,654	
5 March 2016	23rd	Dagenham & Redbridge	A	L	0–1		1,767	
12 March 2016	23rd	Barnet	H	D	1–1	Alessandra 20'	2,890	
19 March 2016	23rd	AFC Wimbledon	A	L	1–2	Penn 38'	3,883	
25 March 2016	23rd	Crawley Town	H	D	2–2	Summerfield 30' pen., Coulson 69'	2,942	
28 March 2016	23rd	Plymouth Argyle	A	L	2–3	Penn 52', Summerfield 86' pen.	8,571	
2 April 2016	23rd	Leyton Orient	H	D	1–1	Fewster 17'	3,234	
9 April 2016	23rd	Wycombe Wanderers	H	D	1–1	Oliver 35'	2,864	
16 April 2016	23rd	Hartlepool United	A	L	1–2	Cameron 45+1'	4,781	
19 April 2016	23rd	Portsmouth	H	W	3–1	Fewster 30', Alessandra 34', Summerfield 48'	3,214	
23 April 2016	23rd	Accrington Stanley	A	L	0–3		2,222	
30 April 2016	24th	Bristol Rovers	H	L	1–4	McEvoy 81'	4,525	
7 May 2016	24th	Morecambe	A	D	1–1	Summerfield 45'+1	1,620	

=== League table (part) ===
Final League Two table (part)
Pos	Club	Pld	W	D	L	F	A	GD	Pts
20th	Crawley Town	46	13	8	25	45	78	−33	47
21st	Morecambe	46	12	10	24	69	91	−22	46
22nd	Newport County	46	10	13	23	43	64	−21	43
23rd	Dagenham & Redbridge	46	8	10	28	46	81	−35	34
24th	York City	46	7	13	26	51	87	−36	34
Key	Pos = League position; Pld = Matches played; W = Matches won; D = Matches drawn; L = Matches lost; F = Goals for; A = Goals against; GD = Goal difference; Pts = Points								
Source									

=== FA Cup ===
FA Cup match details
Round	Date	Opponents	Venue	Result	Score F–A	Scorers	Attendance	Ref.
First round	7 November 2015	Accrington Stanley	A	L	2–3	Oliver 34', Coulson 90+2'	1,475	

=== League Cup ===
League Cup match details
Round	Date	Opponents	Venue	Result	Score F–A	Scorers	Attendance	Ref.
First round	11 August 2015	Bradford City	H	D	2–2 a.e.t. 4–2 pens.	Summerfield 49' pen., Berrett 85'	4,201	
Second round	25 August 2015	Swansea City	A	L	0–3		10,174	

=== Football League Trophy ===
Football League Trophy match details
Round	Date	Opponents	Venue	Result	Score F–A	Scorers	Attendance	Ref.
Second round	6 October 2015	Doncaster Rovers	H	W	2–0	Oliver (2) 5', 50'	1,627	
Northern section quarter-final	10 November 2015	Barnsley	A	L	1–2	Coulson 40'	3,360	

== Transfers ==
=== In ===
Date	Player	Club†	Fee	Ref.
20 May 2015	Vadaine Oliver	(Crewe Alexandra)	Free	
11 June 2015	George Swan	(Wolverhampton Wanderers)	Free	
23 June 2015	James Berrett	(Yeovil Town)	Free	
23 June 2015	Scott Flinders	(Hartlepool United)	Free	
6 July 2015	Eddie Nolan	(Scunthorpe United)	Free	
31 July 2015	Taron Hare	(Scunthorpe United)	Free	
3 August 2015	Reece Thompson	Frickley Athletic	Undisclosed	
27 November 2015	Danny Galbraith	(Gillingham)	Free	
5 January 2016	Kenny McEvoy	Tottenham Hotspur	Free	
15 January 2016	Matty Dixon	Hull City	Free	
29 January 2016	Derek Riordan	(East Fife)	Free	

† Brackets around club names denote the player's contract with that club had expired before he joined York.

=== Out ===
Date	Player	Club†	Fee	Ref.
1 July 2015	Jason Mooney	(Accrington Stanley)	Released	
24 August 2015	Lindon Meikle	(Macclesfield Town)	Released	
9 December 2015	Keith Lowe	(Kidderminster Harriers)	Released	
15 January 2016	Ben Godfrey	Norwich City	Undisclosed	
22 January 2016	Marvin McCoy	(Ebbsfleet United)	Released	
22 January 2016	Anthony Straker	(Grimsby Town)	Released	
25 January 2016	Eddie Nolan	(Blackpool)	Released	
1 February 2016	John McCombe	(Macclesfield Town)	Released	
24 March 2016	Tom Platt	(Harrogate Town)	Released	
10 May 2016	Josh Carson	(Linfield)	Released	
10 May 2016	Taron Hare	(North Ferriby United)	Released	
10 May 2016	Ben Hirst	(Pickering Town)	Released	
10 May 2016	Femi Ilesanmi	(Boreham Wood)	Released	
10 May 2016	Kenny McEvoy	(South Normanton Athletic)	Released	
10 May 2016	Emile Sinclair	(Altrincham)	Released	
10 May 2016	George Swan		Released	
17 May 2016	Luke Summerfield	(Grimsby Town)	Free	
27 May 2016	Russell Penn	(Carlisle United)	Free	
7 June 2016	Dave Winfield	(Ebbsfleet United)	Free	
20 June 2016	Derek Riordan	(Edinburgh City)	Released	
30 June 2016	James Berrett	Grimsby Town	Undisclosed	
30 June 2016	Michael Coulson	(St Johnstone)	Free	
30 June 2016	Michael Ingham	(Tadcaster Albion)	Free	

† Brackets around club names denote the player joined that club after his York contract expired.

=== Loan in ===
Date	Player	Club	Return	Ref.
7 August 2015	David Tutonda	Cardiff City	Terminated early 27 November 2015	
7 August 2015	Stéphane Zubar	AFC Bournemouth	Recalled 27 August 2015	
17 September 2015	Rhys Turner	Oldham Athletic	Terminated early 27 November 2015	
2 October 2015	Michael Collins	Oxford United	Terminated early 27 November 2015	
27 October 2015	Bryn Morris	Middlesbrough	Terminated early 27 November 2015	
18 November 2015	Will Boyle	Huddersfield Town	3 January 2016	
25 November 2015	Kenny McEvoy	Tottenham Hotspur	2 January 2016	
26 November 2015	Bradley Fewster	Middlesbrough	End of season	
26 November 2015	Mark Kitching	Middlesbrough	One-month	
26 November 2015	Jordan Lussey	Bolton Wanderers	Terminated early 10 December 2015	
26 November 2015	Stefan O'Connor	Arsenal	6 January 2016	
7 January 2016	Luke Hendrie	Burnley	End of season	
11 January 2016	Kyle Cameron	Newcastle United	End of season	
12 January 2016	Ntumba Massanka	Burnley	Recalled 11 March 2016	
29 January 2016	Ľubomír Šatka	Newcastle United	End of season	
26 February 2016	Will Boyle	Huddersfield Town	End of season	
8 March 2016	Lewis Alessandra	Rochdale	End of season	
11 March 2016	Scot Bennett	Notts County	End of season	

=== Loan out ===
Date	Player	Club	Return	Ref.
28 August 2015	Tom Platt	Harrogate Town	Recalled 28 September 2015	
29 September 2015	Ben Hirst	Scarborough Athletic	Early-November 2015	
27 January 2016	Tom Platt	Harrogate Town	Made permanent 24 March 2016	
1 February 2016	Emile Sinclair	Guiseley	End of season	
26 February 2016	Taron Hare	Stamford	End of season	
15 March 2016	Callum Rzonca	Stamford	Mid April 2016	

== Appearances and goals ==
Numbers in parentheses denote appearances as substitute.
Players with names struck through and marked † left the club during the playing season.
Players with names in italics and marked * were on loan from another club for the whole of their season with York.
Players listed with no appearances have been in the matchday squad but only as unused substitutes.
Key to positions: GK – Goalkeeper; DF – Defender; MF – Midfielder; FW – Forward

Players included in matchday squads
No.	Pos.	Nat.	Name	League		FA Cup		League Cup		FL Trophy		Total		Discipline	
No.	Pos.	Nat.	Name	Apps	Goals	Apps	Goals	Apps	Goals	Apps	Goals	Apps	Goals	A yellow rectangle, denoting the yellow penalty card shown to a player being cautioned	A red rectangle, denoting the red penalty card shown to a player being sent off
1	GK	ENG	Scott Flinders	43	0	1	0	2	0	2	0	48	0	3	0
2	DF	ATG	~~Marvin McCoy~~ †	14	0	1	0	2	0	2	0	19	0	5	0
3	DF	ENG	Femi Ilesanmi	35 (2)	0	1	0	1	0	2	0	39 (2)	0	4	0
4	MF	IRL	James Berrett	33 (3)	4	0	0	2	1	2	0	37 (3)	5	10	0
5	DF	ENG	~~John McCombe~~ †	5	1	0	0	0	0	1	0	6	1	0	0
5	DF	ENG	Scot Bennett *	11	0	0	0	0	0	0	0	11	0	0	0
6	DF	IRL	~~Eddie Nolan~~ †	11 (4)	1	1	0	1	0	1	0	14 (4)	1	1	0
6	DF	SVK	Ľubomír Šatka *	5 (1)	0	0	0	0	0	0	0	5 (1)	0	3	0
7	MF	ENG	Michael Coulson	20 (2)	5	1	1	0	0	2	1	23 (2)	7	2	0
8	MF	ENG	Luke Summerfield	33 (1)	7	0	0	2	1	0	0	35 (1)	8	4	0
9	FW	ENG	Vadaine Oliver	31 (6)	7	1	1	2	0	2	2	36 (6)	10	7	1
10	MF	ENG	Russell Penn	33 (1)	3	0	0	2	0	1	0	36 (1)	3	5	1
11	MF	NIR	Josh Carson	6 (16)	1	0	0	0 (2)	0	0 (1)	0	6 (19)	1	4	0
12	MF	ENG	~~Bryn Morris~~ * †	3	0	1	0	0	0	0	0	4	0	1	0
12	FW	SCO	Derek Riordan	1 (3)	0	0	0	0	0	0	0	1 (3)	0	0	0
13	MF	GRN	~~Anthony Straker~~ †	6 (5)	0	0	0	0	0	1 (1)	0	7 (6)	0	0	0
14	DF	ENG	George Swan	3 (1)	0	0	0	0	0	1	0	4 (1)	0	1	0
15	DF	ENG	~~Keith Lowe~~ †	15 (1)	1	1	0	2	0	1	0	19 (1)	1	0	0
15	DF	SCO	Kyle Cameron *	18	1	0	0	0	0	0	0	18	1	0	0
16	DF	ENG	Dave Winfield	36 (1)	2	0 (1)	0	2	0	0	0	38 (2)	2	10	2
17	DF	ENG	Taron Hare	0	0	0	0	0	0	0	0	0	0	0	0
18	MF	ENG	~~Tom Platt~~ †	0	0	0	0	0	0	0	0	0	0	0	0
19	FW	ENG	Jake Hyde	4 (7)	0	0 (1)	0	0 (1)	0	0 (1)	0	4 (10)	0	0	0
20	MF	IRL	~~Michael Collins~~ * †	7	0	1	0	0	0	2	0	10	0	3	0
20	FW	ENG	~~Ntumba Massanka~~ * †	1 (2)	0	0	0	0	0	0	0	1 (2)	0	1	0
22	FW	ENG	Reece Thompson	9 (4)	3	0	0	2	0	0 (1)	0	11 (5)	3	1	0
23	FW	ENG	~~Rhys Turner~~ * †	5 (4)	1	0 (1)	0	0	0	0	0	5 (5)	1	0	0
23	MF	ENG	Matty Dixon	6 (1)	0	0	0	0	0	0	0	6 (1)	0	1	0
24	GK	NIR	Michael Ingham	3	0	0	0	0	0	0	0	3	0	0	0
25	MF	ENG	Callum Rzonca	0 (1)	0	0	0	0 (1)	0	0	0	0 (2)	0	0	0
26	MF	ENG	~~Ben Godfrey~~ †	4 (8)	1	1	0	0 (1)	0	1	0	6 (9)	1	2	0
26	FW	ENG	Lewis Alessandra *	11	2	0	0	0	0	0	0	11	2	2	0
27	DF	COD	~~David Tutonda~~ * †	7 (5)	0	0	0	1	0	0 (1)	0	8 (6)	0	0	0
27	DF	ENG	Luke Hendrie *	18	0	0	0	0	0	0	0	18	0	2	1
29	FW	ENG	Emile Sinclair	3 (9)	0	1	0	0	0	1	0	5 (9)	0	0	0
30	MF	ENG	~~Jonathan Greening~~ †	2 (1)	0	0	0	0	0	0	0	2 (1)	0	0	1
31	DF	SCO	Will Boyle *	12	0	0	0	0	0	0	0	12	0	3	1
32	FW	ENG	Bradley Fewster *	18 (6)	8	0	0	0	0	0	0	18 (6)	8	1	0
33	MF	IRL	Kenny McEvoy	10 (9)	2	0	0	0	0	0	0	10 (9)	2	1	0
34	DF	ENG	~~Mark Kitching~~ * †	1	0	0	0	0	0	0	0	1	0	0	0
35	DF	ENG	~~Stefan O'Connor~~ * †	4	0	0	0	0	0	0	0	4	0	1	0
36	MF	ENG	~~Jordan Lussey~~ * †	1	0	0	0	0	0	0	0	1	0	1	0
37	MF	SCO	Danny Galbraith	14 (7)	1	0	0	0	0	0	0	14 (7)	1	2	0
38	DF	GPE	~~Stéphane Zubar~~ * †	4	0	0	0	1	0	0	0	5	0	0	0

Players not included in matchday squads
No.	Pos.	Nat.	Name
20	MF	ENG	~~Lindon Meikle~~ †
21	FW	ENG	Ben Hirst

== See also ==
- List of York City F.C. seasons
