= Callum Rzonca =

English footballer

Personal information
- Full name: Callum James Rzonca
- Date of birth: 7 January 1997 (age 29)
- Place of birth: Leeds, England
- Height: 5 ft 7 in (1.70 m)
- Positions: Midfielder; winger

Youth career
- Huddersfield Town
- Barnsley
- 2013–2015: York City

Senior career*
Years	Team	Apps	(Gls)
2015–2017	York City	11	(1)
2016	→ Stamford (loan)	9	(0)
2017	→ Harrogate Town (loan)	1	(0)
2017–2018	North Ferriby United	17	(0)
2018–2019	Zagłębie Sosnowiec	18	(1)
2019	GKS Katowice	10	(1)
Total		66	(3)
- * Club domestic league appearances and goals

Callum James Rzonca (born 7 January 1997) is an English former professional footballer who played as a midfielder or winger.

Rzonca played in the youth teams at Huddersfield Town and Barnsley before started his senior career with York City in 2015. He was loaned out to Stamford and Harrogate Town before being released by York in 2017.

== Career ==
=== York City ===
Rzonca was born in Leeds, West Yorkshire, and started his career with the youth systems of Huddersfield Town and Barnsley. He started an apprenticeship with York City in 2013, and signed a one-year professional contract with the club in May 2015. Rzonca made his first-team debut on 25 August 2015 as a 71st-minute substitute for Vadaine Oliver in York's 3–0 away defeat to Premier League team Swansea City in the League Cup second round. He joined Northern Premier League Premier Division club Stamford on 15 March 2016 on a one-month loan, making his debut the same day as a 75th-minute substitute in a 4–1 home defeat to Darlington 1883. Rzonca made nine appearances as Stamford were relegated in 21st place in the Northern Premier League Premier Division. He finished the 2015–16 season with two appearances for York, as they were relegated into the National League in 24th place in League Two. He signed a new one-year contract in June 2016.

Rzonca joined National League North club Harrogate Town on 20 January 2017 on a one-month loan. He made his debut on 28 January 2017 as a 71st-minute substitute in a 3–1 home defeat to Gainsborough Trinity. This was Rzonca's only appearance for Harrogate before returning to York. He was released by York at the end of 2016–17.

=== Later career ===
Rzonca signed for newly relegated National League North club North Ferriby United on 28 July 2017 after a successful trial. In January 2018, Rzonca joined Polish side Zagłębie Sosnowiec and was part of the side which achieved promotion to the Ekstraklasa. On 22 January 2019, after a year with Zagłębie, he joined I liga side GKS Katowice on a deal until the end of the season with the option of an additional year. He left the club at the end of the season.

== Style of play ==
Rzonca plays a central midfielder or a left winger.

== Career statistics ==
Appearances and goals by club, season and competition
Club	Season	League			National cup (Note: Includes FA Cup, Polish Cup)		League cup (Note: Includes League Cup)		Other		Total	
Club	Season	Division	Apps	Goals	Apps	Goals	Apps	Goals	Apps	Goals	Apps	Goals
York City	2015–16	League Two	1	0	0	0	1	0	0	0	2	0
York City	2016–17	National League	10	1	0	0	—		0	0	10	1
York City	Total		11	1	0	0	1	0	0	0	12	1
Stamford (loan)	2015–16	Northern Premier League; Premier Division	9	0	—		—		—		9	0
Harrogate Town (loan)	2016–17	National League North	1	0	—		—		—		1	0
North Ferriby United	2017–18	National League North	17	0	1	0	—		1 (Note: Appearance in FA Trophy)	1	19	1
Zagłębie Sosnowiec	2017–18	I liga	13	1	—		—		—		13	1
Zagłębie Sosnowiec	2018–19	Ekstraklasa	5	0	1	0	—		—		6	0
Zagłębie Sosnowiec	Total		18	1	1	0	—		—		19	1
GKS Katowice	2018–19	I liga	10	1	—		—		—		10	1
Career total			66	3	2	0	1	0	1	1	70	4

== Honours ==
Zagłębie Sosnowiec

- I liga runner-up: 2017–18
