= George Swan (footballer) =

English footballer

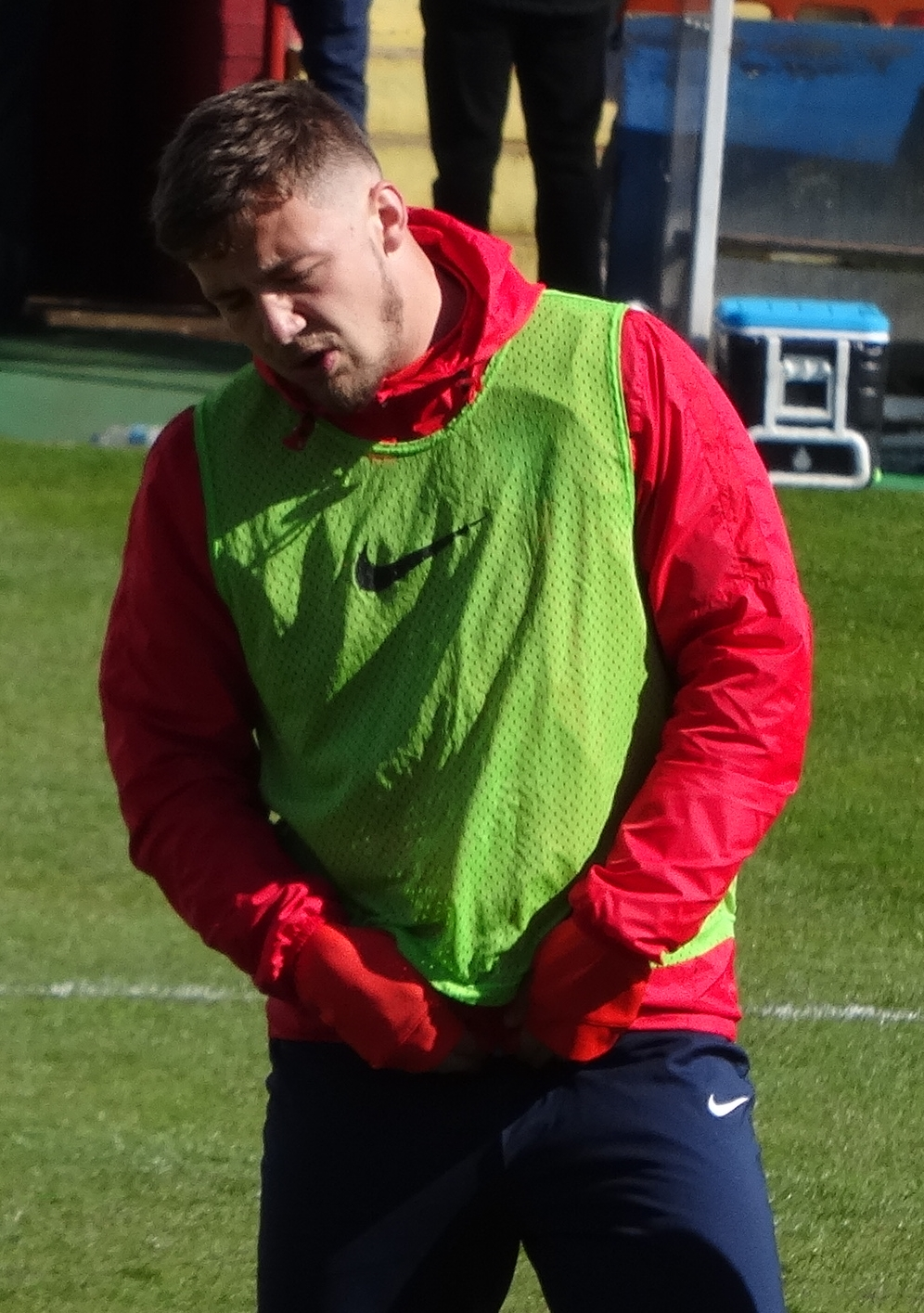
- Swan training with York City in 2016

Personal information
- Full name: George Harry Swan
- Date of birth: 12 September 1994 (age 32)
- Place of birth: Plymouth, England
- Height: 6 ft 3 in (1.91 m)
- Position: Defender

Youth career
- 2005–2009: Leeds United
- 2009–2014: Manchester City
- 2012: Strømsgodset (loan)
- 2013: Sheffield Wednesday (loan)

Senior career*
Years	Team	Apps	(Gls)
2014–2015	Wolverhampton Wanderers	0	(0)
2015–2016	York City	4	(0)
Total		4	(0)
- * Club domestic league appearances and goals

George Harry Swan (born 12 September 1994) is an English former professional footballer who played as a defender for Wolverhampton Wanderers and York City. Swan retired due to injury and became an agent.

== Career ==
Born in Plymouth, Devon, Swan is the son of former professional footballer Peter Swan. He started his career with Leeds United's youth system in 2005 at the age of 10. He signed for Manchester City's youth system in their under-14 squad in 2009, and was named captain of the under-18 squad in 2012. Swan went on loan with Tippeligaen club Strømsgodset in June 2012, before joining Championship club Sheffield Wednesday on a youth loan in September 2013. He was hindered by injuries at City and was released by the club at the end of the 2013–14 season. He went on trial with his former club Leeds in July 2014.

Swan signed for Championship club Wolverhampton Wanderers on a three-month contract on 9 September 2014, and was placed in their under-21 squad. Before his release by Wolves in April 2014, he trained with York City in the closing weeks of 2014–15. He signed for the League Two club on 11 June 2015 on a one-year contract. Swan missed the start of 2015–16 with thigh and calf problems and only made his debut on 10 November 2015 in York's 2–1 away defeat to Barnsley in the Football League Trophy Northern section quarter-final. He was released by York when his contract expired at the end of 2015–16.

== Style of play ==
Swan started his career as a striker, before moving into defence as a ball-playing centre-back. He was a commanding centre-back with the ability to read the game, and his strengths included winning headers and his timing of tackles.

== Personal life ==
After retiring from professional football because of persistent injuries, Swan became the youngest agent in football.

== Career statistics ==
Appearances and goals by club, season and competition
Club	Season	League			National Cup		League Cup		Other		Total	
Club	Season	Division	Apps	Goals	Apps	Goals	Apps	Goals	Apps	Goals	Apps	Goals
Wolverhampton Wanderers	2014–15	Championship	0	0	0	0	—		—		0	0
York City	2015–16	League Two	4	0	0	0	0	0	1 (Note: Appearance in Football League Trophy)	0	5	0
Career total			4	0	0	0	0	0	1	0	5	0
