= Dawson (surname) =

Origin
- Meaning: "son of David"
- Region of origin: United Kingdom

Dawson is a British and Irish surname.

Notable persons with the surname include:

== People ==
- Ally Dawson (1958–2021), Scottish football manager
- Aaron Dawson (born 1992), English footballer
- Abraham Dawson (1816–1884), Irish-Canadian Anglican cleric
- Aeneas Dawson (1810–1894), Scottish-Canadian priest and writer
- Agnes Dawson (1873–1953), British politician and trade unionist
- Alan Dawson (1929–1996), American drummer
- Alex Dawson (1940–2020), Scottish football player
- Alexander Dawson, New South Wales Government Architect, 1856–1862
- Alma Dawson, American scholar of librarianship
- Ambrose Dawson (1707–1794), English physician
- Anderson Dawson (1863–1910), Australian politician
- Andre Dawson (born 1954), American baseball player
- Andy Dawson (born 1978), English footballer
- Andy Dawson (born 1979), English footballer
- Angela Dawson (died 2002), American community activist
- Angela Dawson (born 1968), British canoer
- Anna Dawson (born 1937), English actress and singer
- Anne Dawson, English academic and former broadcast journalist
- Anne Dawson (1896–1989), British spy in occupied Belgium in WW1
- Anthony Dawson (1916–1992), Scottish actor
- Archibald Dawson (1892–1938), Scottish sculptor
- Archie Owen Dawson (1898–1964), American federal judge
- Artie Dawson (1891–1982), Australian rules footballer
- Ashlé Dawson (born 1984), American choreographer, director, and dancer
- Ashley Dawson, American author, activist and professor
- Barbara Dawson (born 1957), Irish art historian, museum gallery director, and curator
- Beatrice Dawson (1908–1976), British costume designer
- Benjamin Dawson (1729–1814), English minister and linguist
- Bernhard Dawson (1890–1960), Argentine-American astronomer
- Bertrand Dawson, 1st Viscount Dawson of Penn (1864–1945), British physician
- Bess Phipps Dawson (1916–1994), American painter
- Beth Dawson, American statistician
- Branden Dawson (born 1993), American basketball player
- Brendon Dawson (born 1967), Zimbabwean rugby union footballer and coach
- Brian Dawson (disambiguation)
- Brigid Dawson, British musician
- Brihony Dawson (born 1984), Australian television presenter, sports commentator and singer
- Cameron Dawson (born 1995), English football player
- Carroll Dawson, American basketball assistant coach and general manager
- Casey Dawson (born 2000), American speed skater
- Chad Dawson (born 1982), American boxer
- Charles Dawson (disambiguation)
- Charlotte Dawson (1966–2014), New Zealand–Australian television personality
- Christopher Dawson (1889–1970), British historian
- Clifton Dawson (born 1983), Canadian gridiron football player
- Coningsby Dawson (1883–1959), English-American novelist
- Connor Dawson (born 1993), American baseball coach
- Craig Dawson (born 1990), English footballer
- Curt Dawson (1939–1985), American stage and television actor
- Dale Dawson (1964–2018), American football player
- Dan Dawson (born 1981), Canadian lacrosse player
- Daniel Dawson (born 1977), Australian kickboxer and boxer
- Daryl Dawson (born 1933), Australian judge and naval officer
- David Dawson (disambiguation)
- Dennis Dawson (born 1949), Canadian politician
- Dermontti Dawson (born 1965), former American football player
- Digger Dawson (1905–?), English professional footballer
- Donald Dawson (1908–2005), American lawyer and presidential aide
- Donald A. Dawson (born 1937), Canadian mathematician
- Duke Dawson (born 1996), American football player
- Earl Dawson (1925–1987), Canadian politician and ice hockey administrator
- Eddie Dawson (1904–1979), English cricketer
- Edgar Dawson (1931–2015), English rugby league footballer
- Edgar Gilmer Dawson (1830–1883), American lawyer, planter, and major
- Ellen Dawson (1900–1967), Scottish-American trade union activist
- Eric Dawson (born 1984), American basketball player
- Eric E. Dawson (1937–2017), American politician
- Ernest Dawson (1882–1947), American antiquarian bookseller and Sierra Club president
- Frances L. Dawson (1903–1995), American educator and politician
- Fred Dawson (1884–1965), American college sports coach
- Genoveva Dawson (1918–2012), Argentine botanist, curator, teacher, and explorer
- Geoffrey Dawson (1874–1944), British newspaper editor
- George Dawson (disambiguation)
- Geralyn Dawson, American romance novelist
- Gladys Dawson (1909–1993), English artist
- Glen Dawson (1906–1968), American steeplechase runner
- Glen Dawson (1912–2016), American mountaineer
- Greg Dawson (born 1950), American consumer rights columnist
- Harry Medforth Dawson (1875–1939), English physical chemist
- Hailey Dawson (born 2010), American record setter
- Henry Dawson (disambiguation)
- Hilton Dawson (born 1953), British politician
- Horace Dawson (born 1926), American diplomat
- Ida Wharton Dawson (1860–1928), American social worker and clubwoman
- Isabel Dawson (1917–1982), Canadian politician
- Ivan Dawson, British Virgin Islands politician
- Ivo Dawson (1879–1934), British actor
- Jack Dawson (disambiguation)
- Jaimie Dawson (born 1969), Canadian badminton player
- James Dawson (disambiguation)
- Janet Dawson (born 1935), Australian artist
- Joe or Joseph Dawson (disambiguation)
- John Dawson (disambiguation)
- Johnnie Dawson (1914–1984), American baseball player
- Jonathan Dawson (director) (1941–2013), Australian academic, filmmaker, film and literary critic and broadcaster
- Karl Dawson, British Virgin Islands politician
- Kathleen Dawson (born 1997), Scottish swimmer
- Keyunta Dawson (born 1985), American football player
- Kimya Dawson (born 1972), American singer-songwriter
- Lafayette Dawson (1839–1897), American lawyer and judge
- Leanne Dawson, English academic
- Len Dawson (1935–2022), American football player
- Les Dawson (1931–1993), British comedian
- Lorne L. Dawson, Canadian sociologist of religion
- Lynne Dawson (born 1956), English soprano
- Mabel Dawson (1887–1965), Scottish artist
- Margaret Dawson (1770–1816), convict on the First Fleet
- Matt Dawson (born 1972), English rugby player
- Michael Dawson (disambiguation)
- Montagu Dawson (1919–2003), Royal Air Force officer
- Montague Dawson (1890–1973), maritime artist
- Nicholas Mosby Dawson, Texas ranger, killed during the Dawson massacre
- Ossie Dawson (1919–2008), South African cricketer
- Percy Dawson (baseball) (1889–1982), American baseball owner, executive, manager, and coach
- Peter Dawson (disambiguation)
- Phil Dawson (born 1975), American football player
- Phire Dawson, American model
- Portia Dawson, American actress
- Rachel Dawson (born 1985), American field hockey player
- Rian Dawson, American drummer
- Richard Dawson (disambiguation)
- Robert Dawson (disambiguation)
- Roger Dawson (born 1940), American jazz musician, composer, and DJ
- Ronnie Dawson (born 1995), American baseball player
- Ronnie Dawson (born 1932), Irish rugby player
- Rosario Dawson (born 1979), American actress
- Roxann Dawson (born 1958), American actress and director
- Sally Dawson (born 1955), American theoretical physicist
- Sandra Dawson (disambiguation)
- Sarah Morgan Dawson (1842–1909), American writer
- Scott Dawson (born 1984), American professional wrestler
- Scott Dawson (evangelist) (born 1967), American evangelist
- Shane Dawson (born 1988), American comedian and actor
- Shawn Dawson (born 1993), Israeli basketball player
- Simon James Dawson (1818–1902), Scottish-Canadian engineer and politician
- Smoky Dawson (1913–2008), Australian singer and entertainer
- Thomas Dawson (disambiguation)
- Tommy Dawson (1901–1977), English footballer
- Trent Dawson (born 1971), American actor
- Valina L. Dawson, American neuroscientist
- Velma Wayne Dawson (1912–2007), American puppeteer
- Vernon Dawson (1881–1958), British civil servant
- Vesey John Dawson (1853–1930), British Army general
- Vicky Dawson (born 1961), American actress
- Vivian Dawson (born 1984), New Zealand actor and model
- Walt Dawson (born 1982), American Alzheimer's disease activist
- Walter Dawson (1902–1994), British air chief marshal
- Wil Dawson (born 2005), Australian rules footballer
- William "Red" Dawson (born 1942), American football player and coach
- William A. Dawson (1903–1981), American politician
- William C. Dawson (1798–1856), American politician
- William Curran Dawson (1818–1893), American politician
- William Dawson (mayor) (1825–1901), mayor of Saint Paul, Minnesota
- William Dawson (diplomat) (1885–1972), United States diplomat
- William Dawson (sportsman) (1850–1916), English cricketer & rugby union player
- William Dawson (Missouri politician) (1848–1929), American politician
- William Dawson (ornithologist) (1927–2020), American ornithologist, zoologist, and professor
- William Dawson (college president) (1704–1752), American academic
- William Dawson (New Zealand politician) (1852–1923), New Zealand politician
- William Eddison Dawson (1829–1902), Canadian politician
- William Francis Dawson, Road builder in Sri Lanka
- William Harbutt Dawson (1860–1948), British journalist, civil servant and author
- William Henderson Dawson, British singer-songwriter
- William James Dawson (1854–1928), English clergyman, lecturer, and author
- William Johnston Dawson (1765–1796), American politician
- William L. Dawson (composer) (1899–1990), American composer
- William L. Dawson (politician) (1886–1970), American politician
- William Leon Dawson (1873–1928), American ornithologist, author and lecturer
- William M. O. Dawson, American politician
- William McDonell Dawson (1822–1890), Canadian politician
- Willow Dawson (born 1975), Canadian cartoonist and illustrator
- Zac Dawson (born 1986), Australian rules footballer and manager
- Zara Dawson (born 1983), English actress
- Zhanna Arshanskaya Dawson (1927–2023), Russian-American musician
- Zoe Dawson (born 1979), British actress

== Fictional characters ==
- Antonio Dawson, on the TV series Chicago P.D.
- Bella Dawson from Bella and the Bulldogs
- Caroline Dawson, in the UK drama series Last Tango in Halifax
- Dudley "Booger" Dawson, in the Revenge of the Nerds franchise
- Jack Dawson (character), from the 1997 film Titanic
- Joe Dawson (Highlander), on the TV show Highlander
- J.M. Dawson, a character in The Adventures of Tintin comic series adventure The Blue Lotus
- Michael Dawson (Lost), a character on the TV show Lost
- Monica Dawson, a character on the TV show Heroes

== See also ==
- Dawson (disambiguation)
- Dawson Dawson-Walker (1868–1934), British clergyman, classicist, theologian and academic
