= William Dawson =

William Dawson may refer to:

== Politicians ==
- William Dawson, 1st Viscount Carlow (died 1779), Anglo-Irish politician and peer
- William Johnston Dawson (1765–1796/8), U.S. representative from North Carolina
- William L. Dawson (politician) (1886–1970), U.S. representative from Illinois
- William M. O. Dawson (1853–1916), governor of West Virginia
- William Dawson (diplomat) (1885–1972), career United States diplomat
- William A. Dawson (1903–1981), U.S. representative from Utah
- William C. Dawson (1798–1856), United States senator from Georgia
- William Curran Dawson (1818–1893), Alabama politician, soldier
- William Dawson (Missouri politician) (1848–1929), U.S. representative from Missouri
- William Dawson (mayor) (1825–1901), mayor of St. Paul, Minnesota
- William McDonell Dawson (1822–1890), member of the Legislative Assembly for Canada East
- William Dawson (New Zealand politician) (1852–1923), New Zealand politician for Dunedin Suburbs, co-founder of Speight's brewery
- William Eddison Dawson (1829–1902), English-born businessman and political figure on Prince Edward Island

== Other people ==
- William Dawson (college president) (1704?–1752), second president of the College of William & Mary
- William Dawson (sportsman) (1850–1916), English cricketer and rugby union player
- William "Red" Dawson (born 1942), American football player
- William Harbutt Dawson (1860–1948), British writer
- William James Dawson (1854–1928), English clergyman and author
- William L. Dawson (composer) (1899–1990), African-American composer
- William Francis Dawson (died 1829), road builder in British Ceylon, present-day Sri Lanka
- William Henderson Dawson (died 1879), Tyneside poet, songwriter, author and bookbinder
- William Leon Dawson (1873–1928), American ornithologist, author and lecturer
- William Dawson (ornithologist) (1927–2020), American ornithologist
- Wil Dawson (born 2005), Australian rules footballer
- Bill Dawson (software engineer) (William Dawson, born 1958), software engineer and co-founder of Xoom

== Other uses ==
- William Dawson (1812 ship), launched at Lancaster as a West Indiaman

== See also ==
- John William Dawson (1820–1899), Canadian geologist and Principal of McGill University
- Bill Dawson (disambiguation)
