= Andrew Gerle =

American composer and pianist

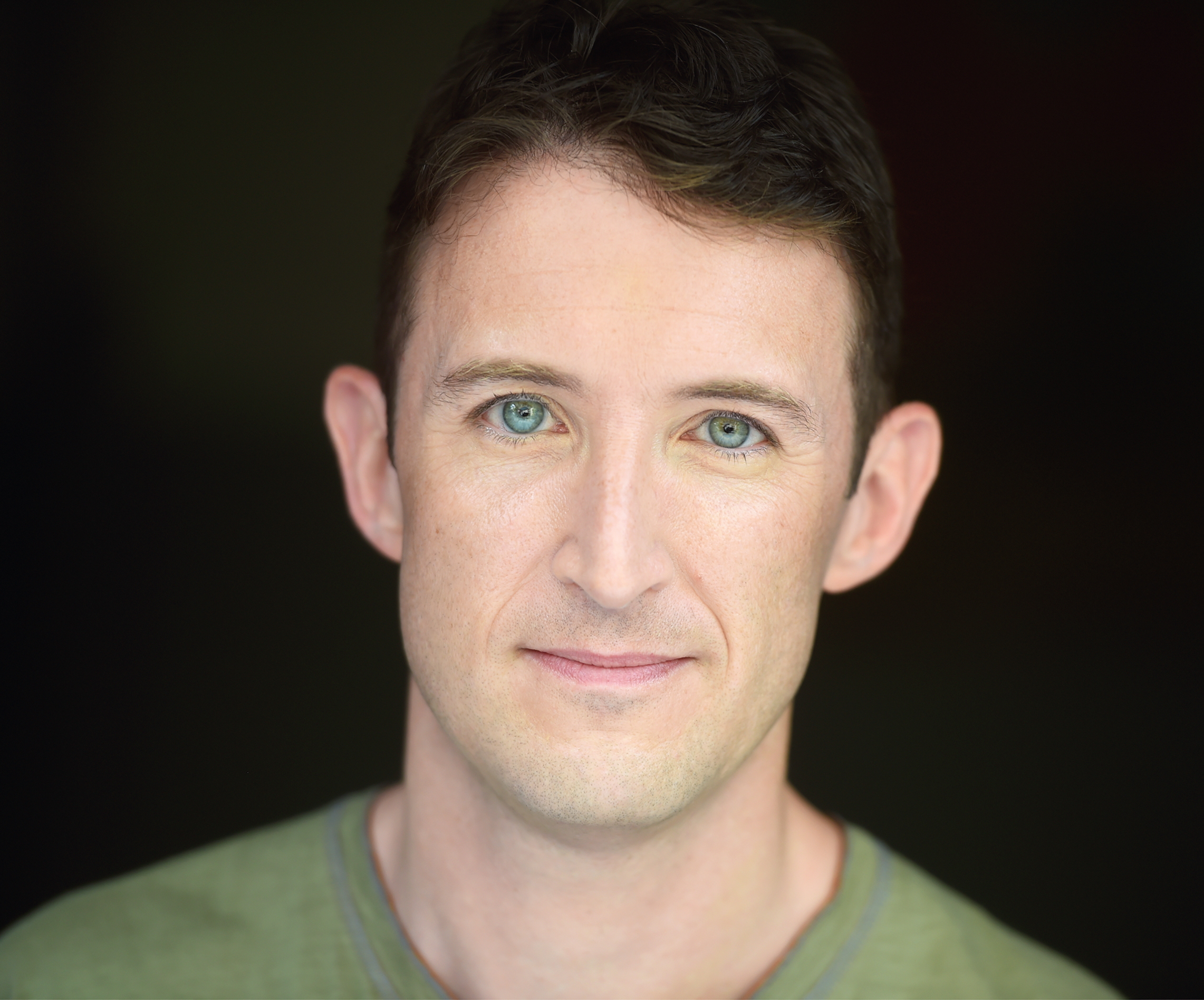
- Gerle onstage in New York City on September 20, 2013.

Background information
- Genres: Music theater, opera
- Occupations: Composer, pianist
- Website: http://andrewgerle.com/

Andrew Adrian Gerle is an American composer and pianist known for his musical adaptation of Meet John Doe with librettist Eddie Sugarman, which premiered at Ford's Theatre in Washington. He has received four Richard Rodgers Awards administered by the American Academy of Arts and Letters, as well as a Jonathan Larson Grant. His opera The Beach, a collaboration with librettist Royce Vavrek, debuted May 14, 2011, as part of New York City Opera's VOX Contemporary American Opera Lab.

== Early life and education ==
Andrew is the son of classical recording artists Marilyn Neeley and Robert Gerle. He started his musical career as a classical pianist in the Baltimore area. While attending Yale University, he won the Yale Symphony’s concerto competition and the National Symphony Orchestra’s Young Artists’ Competition and appeared as a guest soloist with both orchestras. During this time, he was also invited to participate in a private competition for Maestro Mstislav Rostropovich at the Kennedy Center.

== Career ==
=== Music ===
After graduating magna cum laude from Yale, he moved to New York City and began work as a musical director and accompanist. He has worked with Kitty Carlisle Hart, John Raitt, Leslie Uggams, Jennifer Holliday, Brian Stokes Mitchell, Michael Rupert, and Liz Callaway. He was selected by the Rodgers and Hammerstein Organization to create a complete re-orchestration of South Pacific for a major regional production and has worked on projects for composers including John Kander, Ricky Ian Gordon, Scott Frankel, and Michael Korie.

As a musical theatre composer, he is a three-time recipient of the Richard Rodgers Award for new musical writing, administered by Stephen Sondheim and the American Academy of Arts and Letters, for The Tutor (book and lyrics by Maryrose Wood), and in 2011 won his fourth for his original musical, Gloryana. He won a 2006 Jonathan Larson Award from the American Theatre Wing for Meet John Doe (lyrics by Eddie Sugarman), which had its world premiere at Ford’s Theatre in Washington, D.C., in 2007 and was nominated for seven Helen Hayes Awards. He was also the first recipient of the Burton Lane Fellowship for Young Composers, awarded by the Theater Hall of Fame. His songs have been performed on Public Radio International, at Symphony Space, at the Public Theatre, at the Lincoln Center's Songbook series in New York, and on VH1’s Save the Music benefit.

Over a dozen orchestras have performed Andrew’s arrangements of Broadway standards, including the Boston Pops. He created an evening of new arrangements and orchestrations for the Baltimore Symphony's Gershwin Centennial celebration, where he performed as a piano soloist. His work as a musical director has taken him from off-Broadway to regional theatres, including in Texas, Cape Cod, Russia, and Taiwan.

At 26, he was one of the youngest conductors ever to conduct a major international orchestra when he led the Seoul Philharmonic Symphony in a series of sold-out concerts at the 3,000-seat Sejong Cultural Center. He has been a writer in-residence at the Eugene O'Neill National Musical Theatre Conference and a fellow at the MacDowell Artists’ Colony in New Hampshire and the Ucross Foundation in Wyoming.

In 2024, Gerle released an "electro-swing musical" called "Whisper Darkly" in collaboration with DJ Salisbury.

=== Theatre ===
Andrew’s play, Renovations, based on the memoir by John Marchese, premiered at the White Plains Performing Arts Center in 2011.

His song cycle Drink Well and Sing, based on ancient Greek love poetry, also premiered when played by American countertenor Lawrence Zazzo at London’s Wigmore Hall.

His opera, The Beach, received its premiere reading as part of New York City Opera’s VOX series in May 2011. A CD of Andrew’s jazz arrangements of the songs of Maltby & Shire with vocalist Christa Justus was released in 2010 under the PS Classics label.

As an actor, Andrew appeared in the 2009 revival of Terrence McNally’s Master Class at the Paper Mill Playhouse in New Jersey, starring Tony nominee Barbara Walsh, and also appeared in productions of Two Pianos, Four Hands. In 2010, he was heard as the “hands” of Coalhouse Walker, Jr. in the Tony Award-winning revival of Ahrens & Flaherty’s Ragtime at the Neil Simon Theater.

He was the musical director of the off-Broadway revival of Closer Than Ever and the cast album on Jay Records.

==== Books ====
Andrew is the author of The Enraged Accompanist’s Guide to the Perfect Audition, which was published in early 2011 by Bloomsbury Publishing (as a part of the Applause Books series). He is also the author of Music Essentials for Singers and Actors, which was published in mid-2018, with a foreword by Kristin Chenoweth.

==== Teaching ====
He teaches musical theater at the Manhattan School of Music in New York and musical theatre songwriting at Yale University.
