= Muriel Kerr =

Canadian pianist and music instructor

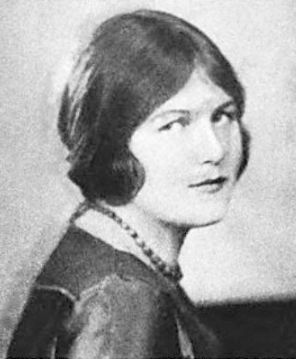
- Kerr pictured in 1929.
- Born: January 18, 1911; Regina, Saskatchewan, Canada
- Died: September 18, 1963 (aged 52); California, United States
- Occupations: Pianist, associate professor
- Years active: 1928–1963
- Spouse: Naoum Benditzky (married 1938)

Muriel Kerr Benditzky (née Kerr; January 18, 1911 – September 18, 1963) was a Canadian pianist and music instructor with the Juilliard School and University of Southern California.

== Early life and education ==
Kerr was born in Regina, Saskatchewan to Lorence and Edith Kerr. Lorence was prominent in Regina's business community as the owner of Kerr Land Company, a real estate development business, and co-owner of the Kerr-Patton Coal Company. During his lifetime, he was known as the developer of the "impressive" multistory Kerr Block on Regina's Scarth Street. The house he built in Regina for his family in 1911, the Kerr Residence (2326 College Avenue), became a municipal heritage property in 2007, and remains on the National Historic Sites of Canada register as of 2026.

=== Education ===
Muriel Kerr began learning piano early in life and gave her first public performance at the age of seven, playing Mozart's Piano Concerto No. 24. Her grade school friends would later recall that her mother "kept [Kerr] to a stringent schedule of four to six hours of practice daily." Kerr was not allowed to play with friends outdoors until she completed her assigned study, which she would do "obediently, though not always happily".

For a short time, she studied under Paul Wells in Toronto at the Royal Conservatory of Music. Hoping to further Kerr's music career, her family relocated to the United States permanently in 1919.

=== Musical education ===
In 1920, Kerr won a scholarship to study with Percy Grainger in Chicago for seven weeks over the summer. Kerr remained in Chicago for two years under the mentorship of Alexander Raab until Raab left for Europe in 1922. Kerr subsequently relocated to New York City to work with Ernest Hutcheson, studying privately for four years before serving as his assistant at Juilliard between 1926 and 1930.

== Career ==
=== Concert pianist ===
In 1928, Kerr was among the first recipients of the Franz Schubert Memorial Award. This afforded her an opportunity to record music for Victor Records, perform with the New York Philharmonic, and debut at the Town Hall. Kerr's 1928 recital with the Philharmonic was poorly received by critics, though her 1929 performance at the Town Hall attracted more positive reviews. For Victor Records, Kerr recorded two Scriabin Études.

Kerr maintained a career as a concert pianist from the 1930s onward, performing under her maiden name during her two marriages. She embarked on her first European tour in 1948, and recorded compositions by Robert Schumann and Paul Hindemith for Victor Records in 1952.

=== Teaching ===
In 1942, Kerr began teaching at Juilliard. She visited its first president, John Erskine, at his home throughout his 1949 recovery from a cerebral haemorrhage to play music for him. Her relationship with Erskine's successor, William Schuman, was not as positive. In March 1950, she resigned in protest after Schuman introduced a policy terminating the employment of older instructors such as Carl Friedberg.

Kerr joined the faculty of the University of Southern California in 1955, and began serving as the director of the Punahou Music School in Honolulu in 1957. In the latter role, Kerr organized an annual festival of contemporary music and art. For her contributions to Hawaii's musical development, she was honoured by the Sigma Alpha Iota in 1958. She was also a member of Mu Phi Epsilon from 1956 onward.

== Reception ==
Kerr's popularity with audiences occasionally eclipsed her estimation by critics, though she was consistently well received by her peers. Writing in 1957, Abram Chasins described Kerr as one of his contemporaries "whose abilities exceed their public recognition."

Throughout her lifetime, Kerr was regarded by the residents of her birth city and province as a source of pride. She featured often in the column of Dan Cameron, long-running music correspondent for the Regina-based Leader Post. Cameron himself had assisted Kerr when she performed as a novelty "child pianist" across Saskatchewan in her youth. Throughout her career, he occasionally reprinted reviews sent in by readers from other newspapers about performances that had featured Kerr, but only the sections related to her.

== Personal life and death ==
Kerr owned a Turkish Angora cat during the 1930s, which was a "constant companion" during her four hours of daily practice. Though she described music as both her career and principal hobby, she was also noted to enjoy bridge and ping-pong. While travelling, she enjoyed reading classic literature and biographies.

In 1928, Kerr, then 17, eloped to marry Harry Fagin, a 21-year-old violinist and fellow Juilliard student. The marriage took Kerr's parents by surprise, though Ernest Hutcheson was aware of his students' intentions and kept their plan to marry a secret. To the justice of the peace who married them, Kerr and Fagin claimed to be aged 21 and 24 respectively. They divorced in September 1937.

During the 1930s, Kerr performed with the Gordon String Quartet, of which Russian-born cellist Naoum Benditzky (1901–1972) was also a member. They married in April 1938 and remained together until Kerr's death.

=== Death ===
Kerr died at her home in 1963 after suffering a fatal asthma attack. Her Schumann and Hindemith recordings were reissued in 1966 to fund a scholarship in Kerr's honour.

== Notable students ==
- Fredric Myrow – composer of the soundtracks for Soylent Green, Scarecrow, and Phantasm.
- Michael Tilson Thomas – conductor, pianist, and composer.
- Marilyn Neeley – Emmy Award-winning pianist.
- Zhanna Arshanskaya Dawson – Russian-American pianist and Holocaust survivor; mother of journalist Greg Dawson. Kerr, described as Zhanna Dawson's "hero," played at the reception of Zhanna's wedding in 1947.
