= Charles Dawson (disambiguation) =

Charles Dawson (1864–1916) was a British amateur archaeologist.

Charles Dawson may also refer to:

- Charles Dawson (billiards player), world champion at English billiards
- Charles B. Dawson, American politician from California
- Charles Dawson (Irish politician) (1842–1917), Irish nationalist MP
- Charles Eric Dawson (1922–1993), Canadian-American ichthyologist
- Charles I. Dawson (1881–1969), United States federal judge from Kentucky
- Charles M. Dawson (1893–1973), lieutenant governor of Indiana
- Chuck Dawson, a fictional character in Action Comics
- Charles Dawson (doctor) (died 1956), New Zealand doctor and member of the Legislative Council in Western Samoa
- Charles C. Dawson, American painter, printmaker, and illustrator
- Charles Dawson (racing driver) (born 1990), British racing driver
- Charlie Dawson, English footballer

== See also ==
- Dawson (surname)
