= Harbutt =

Harbutt is a surname. Notable people with the surname include:

- Charles Harbutt (1935–2015), American photographer
- Sandy Harbutt (1941–2020), Australian actor, writer, and director
- William Harbutt Dawson (1860–1948), British journalist
- William Harbutt (1844–1921), British artist
