= Bill Dawson =

Bill Dawson may refer to:

- William "Red" Dawson (born 1942), former American football player and assistant coach for Marshall University
- Bill Dawson (software engineer) (born 1958), software engineer and co-founder of Xoom

== See also ==
- William Dawson (disambiguation)
