= Gray C. Boyce =

American historian (1899–1981)

Gray Cowan Boyce
- Born: February 19, 1899; San Francisco, California, U.S.
- Died: May 14, 1981 (aged 82)
- Occupations: Historian, bibliographer
- Known for: Five volume bibliography of medieval history

Gray Cowan Boyce (February 19, 1899 – May 14, 1981) was an American medieval historian and historical bibliographer whose masterwork was his five volume Literature of Medieval History, 1930–1975: A Supplement to Louis John Paetow's "A Guide to the Study of Medieval History" (1981).

== Early life ==
Gray Cowan Boyce was born in San Francisco on 19 February 1899 and brought up in Alameda. He received his advanced education at the University of California at Berkeley, received a B.A., M.A., and Ph.D. in 1920, 1921, and 1925 respectively. He went on to further study at Harvard University (1922–23), the University of Grenoble (1925), and the University of Ghent (1925–26).

== Career ==
In 1926, Boyce joined the faculty at Princeton University. He remained there until 1946, apart from three years in the United States Naval Reserve during the Second World War. In 1946 he joined Northwestern University where he remained until his retirement in 1967.

Boyce's interests increasingly tended towards bibliography and scholarly standards. He was on the editorial board of The American Historical Review and one correspondent with that journal quoted approvingly a Boyce review elsewhere where Boyce had said of the reviewed work: "For 364 pages of text there are almost 200 pages of notes. In the opinion of the writer these notes contain material that is not only essential for such a work, but include matter which is frequently as informing and exciting as the narrative itself. A remarkably rich and well-ordered bibliography of forty pages and indexes ... complete the book."

After his retirement, Boyce moved back to Alameda where he lived with his sister Merle and was able to complete his masterwork, a five volume Literature of Medieval History, 1930–1975: A Supplement to Louis John Paetow's "A Guide to the Study of Medieval History" (1981). In later life he suffered from Parkinson's disease and glaucoma.

== Death ==
Boyce died on 14 May 1981. His papers are part of the Northwestern University Library Archival and Manuscript Collections.

== Selected publications ==
- The University of Prague: Modern problems of the German university in Czechoslavakia, Robert Hale, 1937. (With William Harbutt Dawson)
- Literature of Medieval History, 1930–1975: A Supplement to Louis John Paetow's "A Guide to the Study of Medieval History", Kraus, Millwood, N.Y., 1981. (five volumes)
