= Frank McDonnell =

Frank McDonnell may refer to:

- Frank McDonnell (Queensland politician) (1863–1928), Irish born Australian politician and draper
- Frank McDonnell (Irish politician), Irish Fianna Fáil senator
