= Thomas Dawson =

Thomas Dawson may refer to:

- Thomas Dawson (soldier) (1784–1846), American soldier and politician
- Thomas Dawson (politician), Irish politician
- Thomas Rayner Dawson (1889–1951), chess problemist
- Thomas C. Dawson (1865–1912), American diplomat
- Thomas Dawson (college president) (died 1760), president of the College of William and Mary in the 1750s
- Thomas Dawson, 1st Viscount Cremorne (1725–1813), Irish landowner and politician from County Monaghan
- Thomas Dawson (physician) (1725?–1782), English physician, authored medical texts
- Thomas Vesey Dawson (1819–1854), Member of Parliament for County Louth, 1841–1847
- Thomas Vesey Dawson (priest) (1768–1811), Anglican priest in Ireland
- Tommy Dawson (footballer, born 1901) (1901–1977), English football player
- Tommy Dawson (footballer, born 1915) (1915–1972), English football player
- Thomas Dawson, Lord Dawson (1948–2007), Scottish lawyer
- Thomas Hilton Dawson (born 1953), British politician
- Thomas Dawson (cook) (1585–1620), author of the Good Huswife's Jewell, 1585
- Thomas Dawson (speed skater) (born 1942), British Olympic speed skater

== See also ==
- David Thomas Dawson (1957–2006), American murderer
