= Alexander Raab =

American-Hungarian musician

Alexander Raab (14 March 1882 – 2 October 1958) was a Hungarian-American pianist and distinguished piano teacher.

Alexander Raab was born in Győr (also known as Raab), Hungary. He studied at the Vienna Conservatory under Hans Schmitt (1835–1907), Robert Fuchs and Theodor Leschetizky and became acquainted with Johannes Brahms. He presented recitals with the violinist Jan Kubelík in England, Russia, Germany and France.

He immigrated to the US in 1915, and became Head of the Piano Department at Chicago Musical College, before moving to Berkeley, California, where he became esteemed as one of the best piano teachers on the West Coast.

He performed concertos with the Tonkünstler Orchestra of Vienna, Chicago Symphony Orchestra, Minneapolis Symphony Orchestra, and London Symphony Orchestra. Leopold Godowsky dedicated his 1931 transcription of Adolf von Henselt’s Etude in F-sharp major (Si oiseau j'etais), Op. 2, No. 6, to Raab.

Alexander Raab’s piano students included Ernst Bacon, Vera Bradford, George J. Buelow, Muriel Kerr, Wanda Krasoff (who had been referred to Raab by Josef Hofmann), Mortimer Markoff, Sumner Marshall, Robert Owens, and Allan Willman. His pupils also studied under teachers such as Alfred Cortot, Nadia Boulanger, Rudolph Ganz, Percy Grainger, Ernest Hutcheson, and Paul Wells. See: List of music students by teacher: R to S#Alexander Raab.

He made a small number of early Duo-Art and Welte Mignon piano roll recordings, with music of Chopin (Piano Sonata No. 2 in B-flat minor Funeral March), Liszt (Hungarian Rhapsody No. 5 in E minor), Mozart, Brahms, and some salon pieces by minor composers. These recordings appear on CD alongside such distinguished names as Alfred Cortot, Guiomar Novaes, Ignaz Friedman, Arthur Friedheim, Vladimir de Pachmann, Ferruccio Busoni, Josef Hofmann and Harold Bauer.

== Sources ==
- Music and Dance in California and the West, Richard Drake Sauners
