= Michael Dawson =

Michael Dawson may refer to:

- Michael Dawson (footballer) (born 1983), English footballer
- Michael Dawson (Lost), fictional character in Lost
- Michael Dawson (businessman), Irish businessman and former senator
- Michael Dawson (canoeist) (born 1986), New Zealand slalom canoeist
- Mike Dawson (cartoonist) (born 1975), American cartoonist
- Mike Dawson (defensive end) (1953–2008), American football defensive lineman
- Mike Dawson (American football coach) (born 1977), American football coach
- Mike Dawson (politician) (born 1976), Canadian politician
- Mike Dawson, the protagonist of the video games Dark Seed and Dark Seed II
- Michael Dawson, visual effects artist, see Academy Award for Best Visual Effects
- Michael Dawson, executive producer of the TV series Vera
- Michael Dawson (political scientist), American political scientist
