= Nicholas O'Connor =

Irish former politician (born 1945)

Senator
- In office 25 April 1987 – 1 November 1989
- Constituency: Nominated by the Taoiseach

Personal details
- Born: 20 April 1945 (age 80)
- Party: Fianna Fáil

Nicholas O'Connor (born 20 April 1945) is an Irish former Fianna Fáil politician. He served as a member of Seanad Éireann from 1987 to 1989. He was nominated by the Taoiseach Charles Haughey to the 18th Seanad in 1987. He was an unsuccessful candidate at the 1989 Seanad election.
