= Robert Dawson =

Robert or Bob Dawson may refer to:

== Academia ==
- Robert MacGregor Dawson (1895–1958), Canadian political scientist and academic
- Robert L. Dawson (1943–2007), American professor of French language and literature
- Robert Dawson (photographer) (born 1950), American photographer and instructor of photography

== Politics and government ==
- Robert Peel Dawson (1818–1877), Irish member of parliament for Londonderry
- Robert T. Dawson (born 1938), U.S. federal judge
- Robert K. Dawson (public official) (born 1946), U.S. Assistant Secretary of the Army (Civil Works)
- Robert Dawson (Georgia politician), member of the Georgia House of Representatives

== Sports ==
=== Association football ===
- Bob Dawson (footballer) (1921–2023), Australian rules footballer for St Kilda
- Bobby Dawson (1935–1980), English footballer
- Robert Dawson (footballer) (born 1963), Scottish footballer

=== Other sports ===
- Bob Dawson (Canadian football) (1932–2017), Canadian football player
- Bobby Dawson (Canadian football) (born 1966), Canadian football player
- Robert Dawson (wrestler) (born 1963), Canadian freestyle wrestler
- Robert Dawson (cricketer) (born 1970), English cricketer

== Other people ==
- Robert Dawson (bishop) (1589–1643), Anglican bishop in Ireland
- Robert Dawson (general) (1916–1977), New Zealand Army officer in the Second World War and postwar period
- Robert Dawson Esq. (1782–1866), AA Co. company agent and pastoralist
- Robert K. Dawson (surveyor) (1798–1861), English surveyor and cartographer
- W. R. A. Dawson (1891–1918), known as Bob, British Army officer in the First World War
- Bob Dawson (television host) (1924–2014), American television personality, meteorologist, and producer
- Bob Dawson (actor) (c. 1955–2001), Canadian actor and radio personality
