= Paul Kavanagh (politician) =

Irish businessman and politician (died 2022)

Senator
- In office 26 June 1989 – 1 November 1989
- Constituency: Nominated by the Taoiseach

Personal details
- Died: 19 March 2022
- Party: Fianna Fáil
- Spouses: Anne-Marie Kavanagh (m. 2014); Cecily Kavanagh (m. 1967; died 2014)
- Children: 3

Paul Kavanagh (died 19 March 2022) was an Irish businessman and politician. He briefly served as a Fianna Fáil member of the 18th Seanad. He was nominated by the Taoiseach Charles Haughey, on 26 June 1989, to fill a vacancy after the 1989 general election. He did not contest the 1989 Seanad election.

He was the chief executive of Stream International. Kavanagh was also a member of the board of An Post, Aer Lingus, Eircom and CTT.

Kavanagh died on 19 March 2022, after a brief illness at University Hospital Limerick.
