= Jimmy Dawson =

Jim or Jimmy Dawson may refer to:

- Jim Dawson (born 1944), American author who specializes in pop culture
- Jimmy Dawson (basketball, born 1945), American basketball player for the ABA's Indiana Pacers in the 1960s

== See also ==
- Jamie Dawson (1922–2009), commonly mistaken as "Jim" or "Jimmy" Dawson, an American basketball player for the NBL's Sheboygan Red Skins in the 1940s
- James Dawson (disambiguation)
