= Jack Daly (politician) =

Irish politician and businessman (1915–1988)

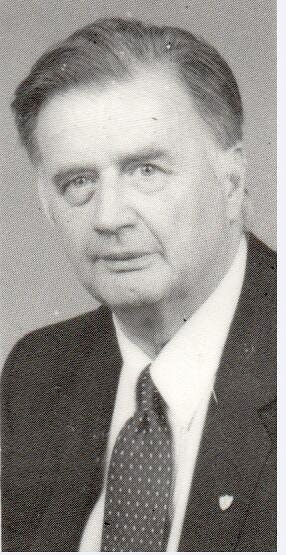

Senator
- In office 13 May 1982 – 5 May 1988
- In office 23 April 1975 – 27 October 1977
- Constituency: Industrial and Commercial Panel

Personal details
- Born: 28 May 1915 County Kerry, Ireland
- Died: 5 May 1988 (aged 72) County Kerry, Ireland
- Party: Fine Gael

Jack Daly (28 May 1915 – 5 May 1988) was a Fine Gael politician from County Kerry in Ireland. He was a member of Seanad Éireann from 1975 to 1977, and again from 1982 to 1988.

The founder and managing director of the motor vehicle business ″Killarney Autos″ in Killarney, County Kerry, Daly was elected to the 13th Seanad on 23 April 1975, at a by-election on the Industrial and Commercial Panel following the death of Denis Farrelly. He was defeated at the 1977 Seanad election, and again at the 1981 election, but was re-elected at the 1982 election to the 16th Seanad. He held the seat until his death in 1988, aged nearly 73. The resulting by-election for his seat in the 18th Seanad was won by the Fianna Fáil candidate Tony Bromell.

In the Seanad, Daly was a consistent advocate for the interests of the motor industry in Ireland, and served for many years on the council of the Society of the Irish Motor Industry. At the time of his death, he was opposition Chief Whip in the Seanad.
