= Glenville, Alabama =

- Unincorporated community
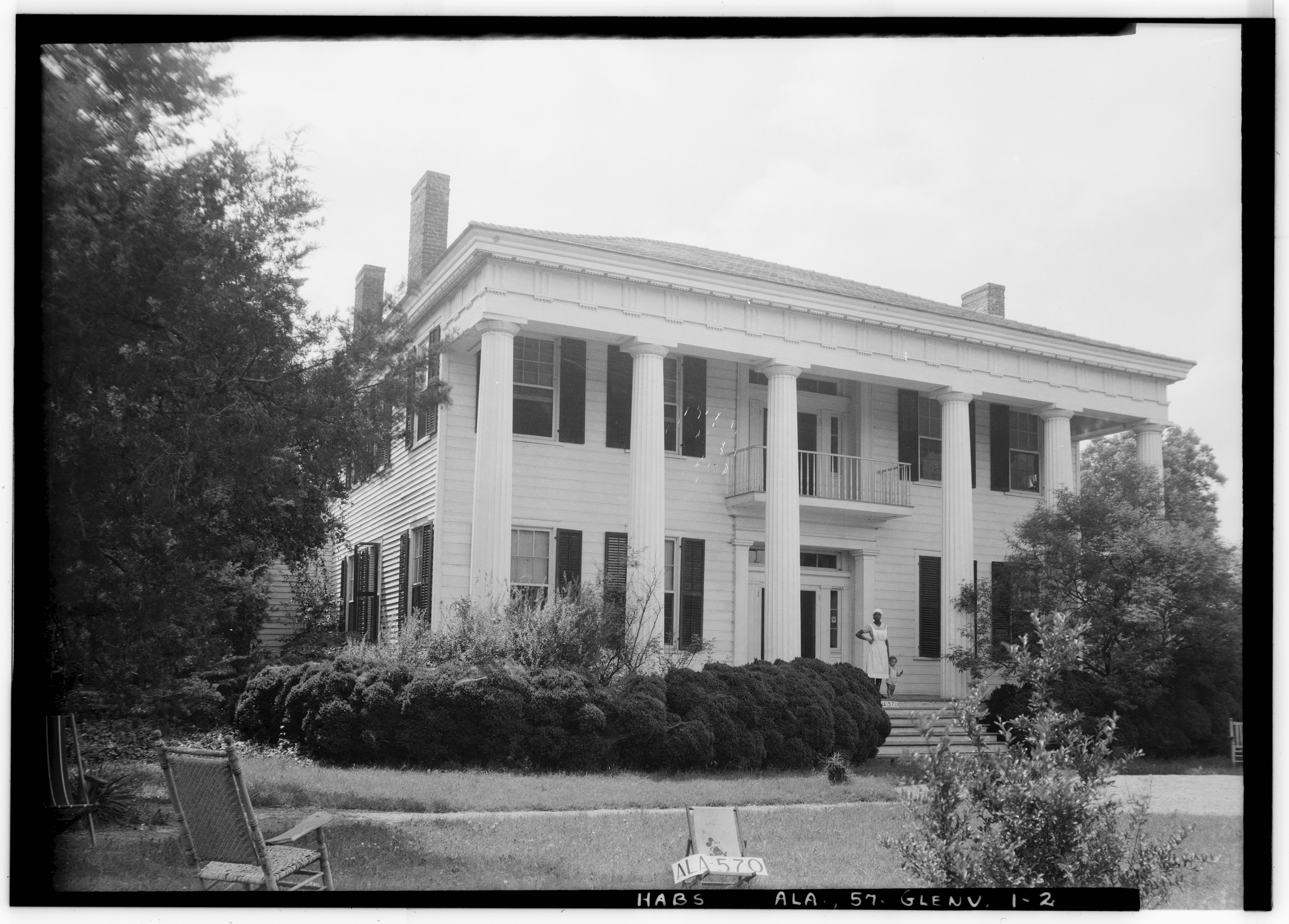
- Glennville Plantation in a 1935 HABS photo

- Location within Alabama Location within the United States
- Coordinates: 32°07′44″N 85°10′37″W
- Country: United States
- State: Alabama
- County: Russell
- Elevation: 463 ft (141 m)
- Time zone: UTC-6 (Central (CST))
  - Summer (DST): UTC-5 (CDT)
- Area code: 334
- GNIS feature ID: 119045
- Glennville Historic District
- U.S. National Register of Historic Places
- U.S. Historic district
- Area: 544 acres (220 ha)
- NRHP reference No.: 79000402
- Added to NRHP: August 7, 1979

Glenville (also spelled Glennville) is an unincorporated community in Russell County, Alabama, United States, which used to be in Barbour County. During the Civil War, Company "H" of the 15th Regiment Alabama Infantry was raised from Barbour and Dale counties and called the "Glenville Guards". The Glennville Historic District, containing the antebellum core of the community, is a historic district listed on the National Register of Historic Places in 1979.

== History ==
Glennville was the first permanent community in what is today Russell County. It was founded in 1835, after the Muscogee removal, by Methodist preacher James Elizabeth Glenn. The town quickly developed into an economic and cultural center of East Alabama. In addition to the Methodist Church, the community was home to Male and Female Academies and the Weyman School for Girls, all of which were renowned throughout the South for their classical curricula. The town also had a post office, stores, a Masonic Lodge, and an inn. The town incorporated in 1854, seeking to attract a rail line, but the line was opposed by many planters in the community. With railroad bypassing Glennville and diminished power and influence of farmers after the Civil War, the town gradually faded.

== Geography ==
Glenville is located in the rural southern portion of Russell County along U.S. Route 431, approximately 17 mi (27 km) north of Eufaula and 26 mi (42 km) southwest of Columbus, Georgia.

== Demographics ==
Historical population
Census	Pop.	Note	%±
1850	900		—
1880	99		—
1890	282		184.8%
U.S. Decennial Census

Glenville appeared on the U.S. Census in 1850 when it was located in Barbour County. It did not reappear again until 1880 with a much-diminished population after the borders were redrawn between Barbour and Russell Counties and it was moved into the latter. It last appeared on the 1890 census.

== Architecture ==
The historic district consists of 32 main structures, 27 outbuildings, and 6 cemeteries. The most prominent are antebellum plantation houses, most of which exhibit Greek Revival style. The Methodist church (built circa 1850) is also Greek Revival, while the Episcopal church (1926) shows Gothic influence. Late 19th- and early 20th-century tenant farmer houses are more modest, and reflect the changing fortunes of the town.

== Notable person ==
- William Curran Dawson, former member of the Alabama House of Representatives

== Gallery ==
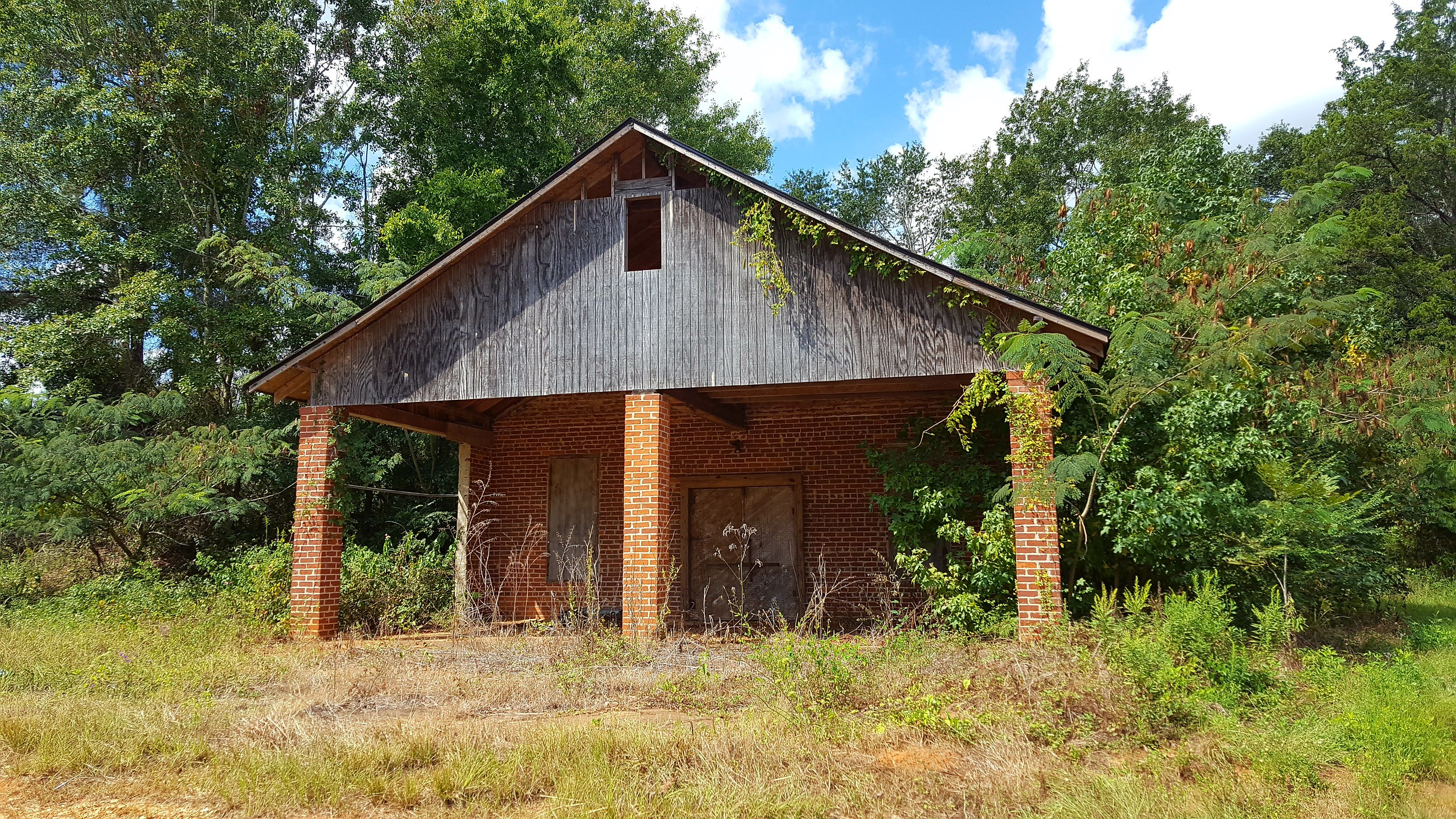
Abandoned Store - September 2018

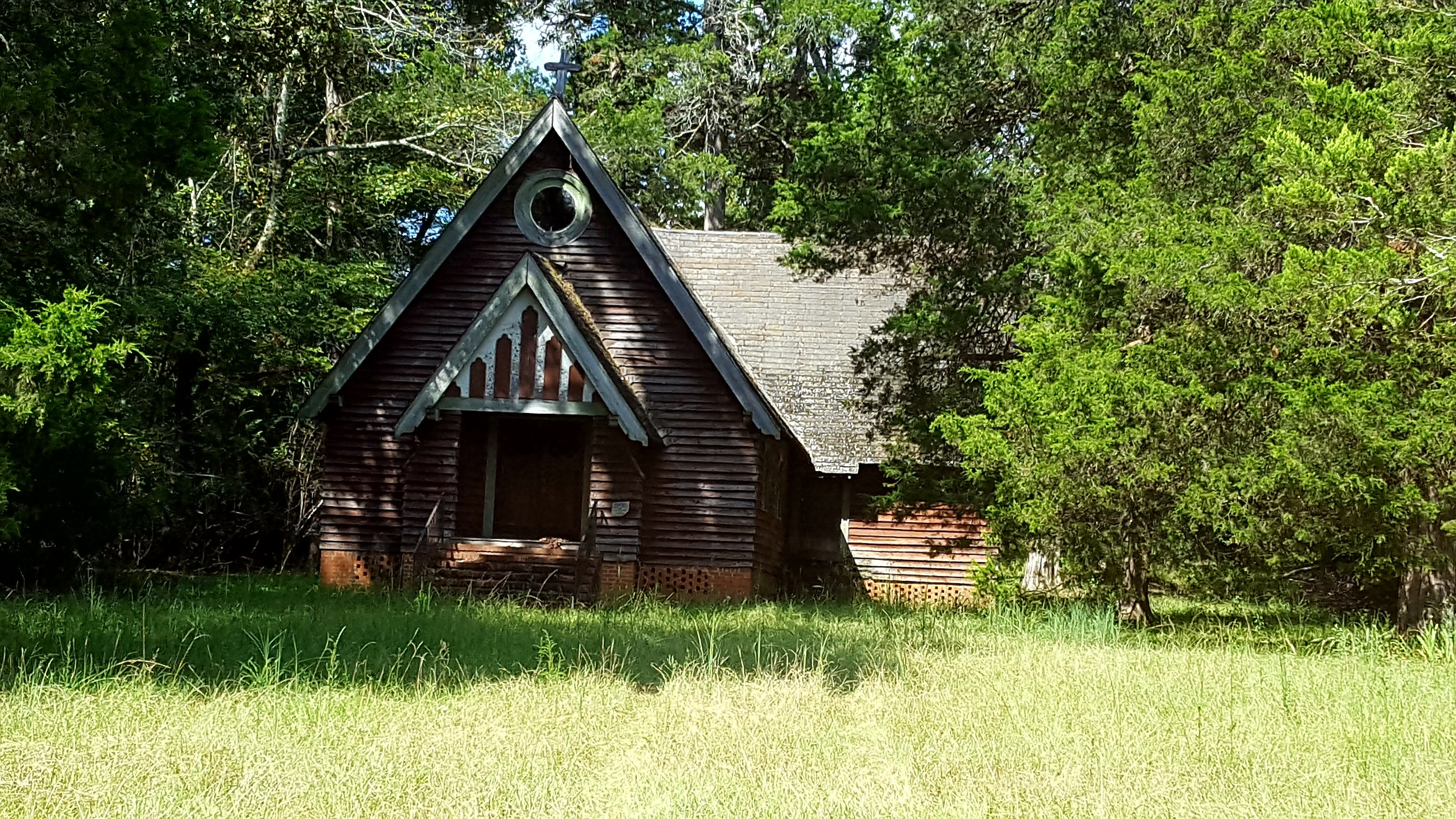
Episcopal Church - September 2018

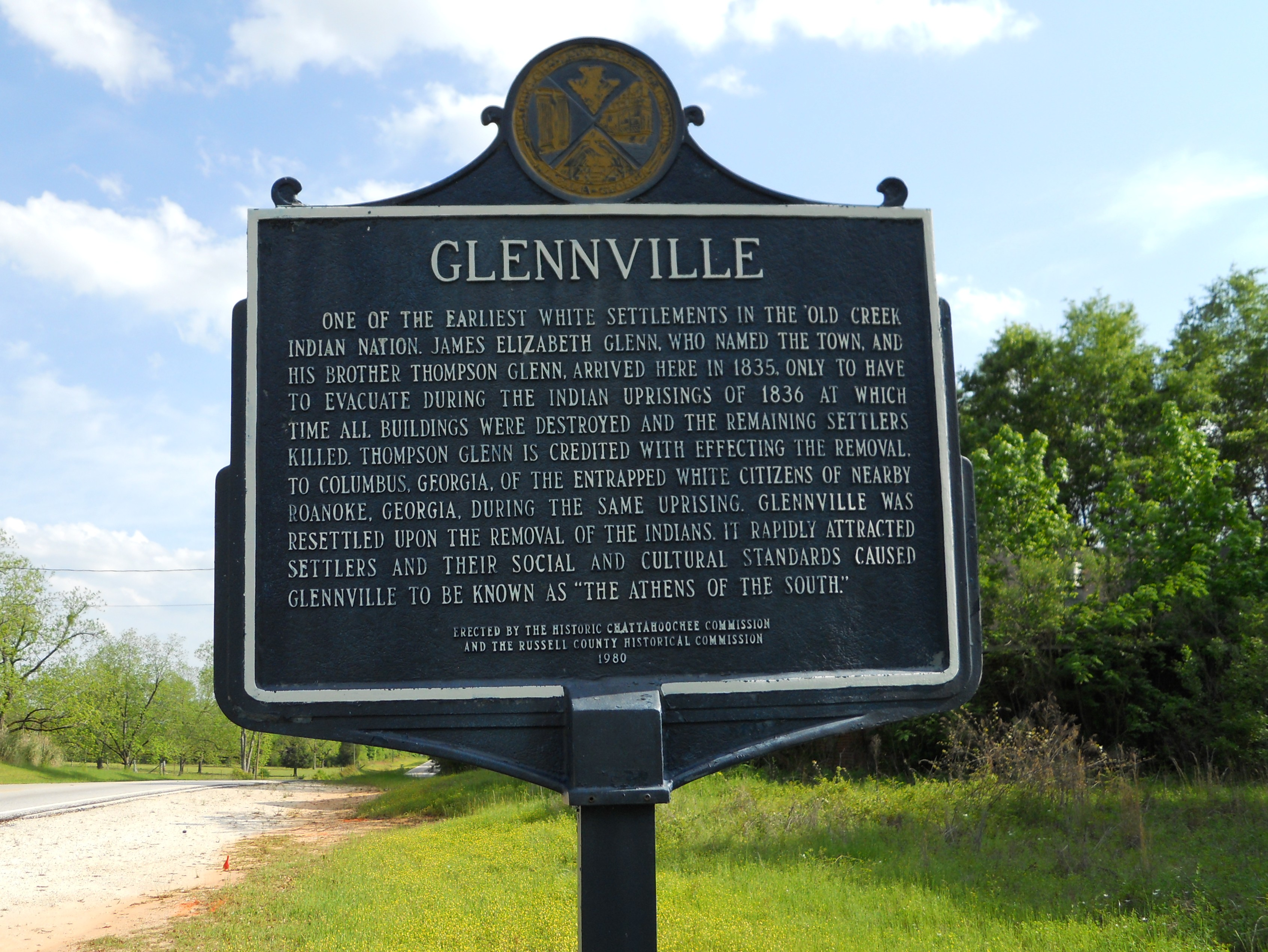
Glennville Historic District Historic Marker - September 2018

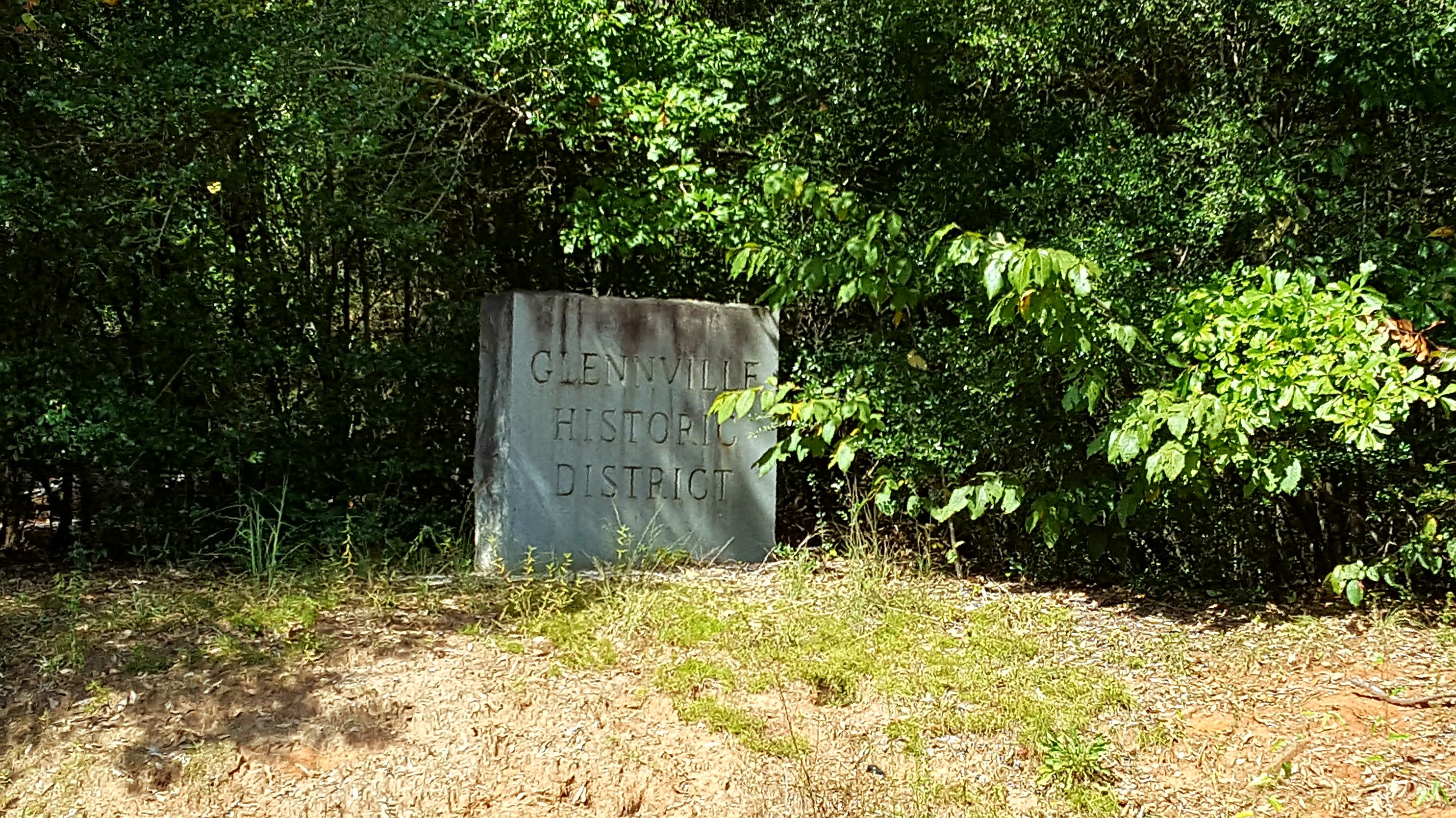
Glenville Historic District Monument - September 2018

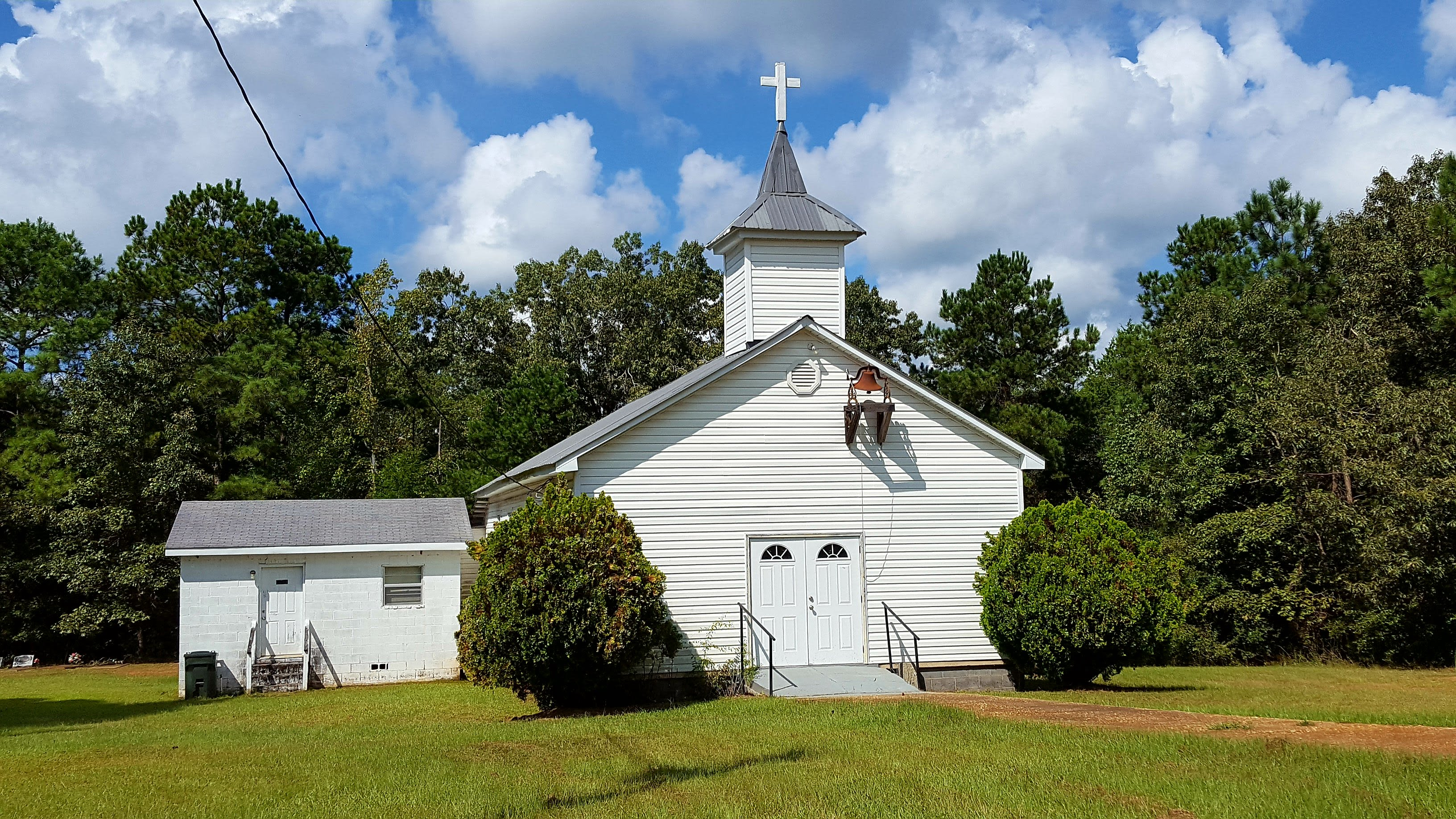
St. John's Methodist Church - September 2018
