= David Dawson =

David Dawson may refer to:

- David Dawson (painter) (born 1960), British artist
- David Dawson (choreographer) (born 1972), British choreographer
- David Dawson (politician) (born 1973), Iowa State Representative
- David Dawson (actor) (born 1982), English actor
- David Dawson (cricketer) (born 1982), Australian cricketer
- David Stewart Dawson (1849–1932), Australian manufacturing jeweler and property tycoon
- David Thomas Dawson (1957–2006), American convicted murderer

== See also ==
- Dawson (surname)
