= Tony Bromell =

Irish educationalist and politician (1932–2017)

Senator
- In office 19 December 1988 – 5 July 1989
- Constituency: Industrial and Commercial Panel

Personal details
- Born: 1932; Limerick, Ireland
- Died: 3 January 2017 (aged 84–85); Limerick, Ireland
- Political party: Fianna Fáil
- Spouse: Áine ní Thuathaigh
- Children: 4

Tony Bromell (1932 – 3 January 2017) was an educationalist and Fianna Fáil politician from Limerick in Ireland.

Born in Limerick in 1932, Bromell was a member of Fianna Fáil all his life, and was a member of Limerick City Council for 17 years, serving as Mayor of Limerick from 1982 to 1983. He was also briefly a senator, after winning a by-election to the 18th Seanad for the Industrial and Commercial Panel on 19 December 1988, following the death of Fine Gael senator Jack Daly.

Bromell was registrar in Mary Immaculate College from 1967 until he retired in 1998. As chair of Chair of Limerick's Vocational Education Committee (VEC) in 1973, he was heavily involved in the establishment of the College of Art, Commerce and Technology (now TUS Limerick). He was also a founding member of a pressure group established in 1958 to campaign for a university for Limerick, which resulted the establishment in 1970 of the National Institute for Higher Education (NIHE), and as a senator he was able to welcome the bill which in 1989 elevated NIHE to the University of Limerick.

He died on 3 January 2017.
