= 18th Seanad =

Members of the Seanad from 1987 to 1989

←	17th Seanad	19th Seanad	→

Overview
- Legislative body: Seanad Éireann
- Jurisdiction: Ireland
- Meeting place: Leinster House
- Term: 25 April 1987 – 5 July 1989
- Government: 20th government of Ireland
- Members: 60
- Cathaoirleach: Tras Honan (FF)
- Leas-Chathaoirleach: Charles McDonald (FG)
- Leader of the Seanad: Mick Lanigan

The 18th Seanad was in office from 1987 to 1989. An election to Seanad Éireann, the Senate of the Oireachtas (Irish parliament), followed the 1987 general election to the 25th Dáil. The senators served until the close of poll for the 19th Seanad.

== Cathaoirleach ==
On 25 April 1987, Tras Honan (FF) was proposed as Cathaoirleach by Mick Lanigan (FF) and seconded by William Ryan (FF). She was elected without a division.

On 20 May 1987, Charles McDonald (FG) was proposed as Leas-Chathaoirleach by Maurice Manning (FG) and seconded by Katharine Bulbulia (FG). He was elected without a division.

== Composition of the 18th Seanad ==
There are a total of 60 seats in the Seanad: 43 were elected on five vocational panels, 6 were elected from two university constituencies and 11 were nominated by the Taoiseach.

The following table shows the composition by party when the 18th Seanad first met on 25 April 1987.

Origin Party	Vocational panels					NUI	DU	Nominated	Total
Origin Party	Admin	Agri	Cult & Educ	Ind & Comm	Labour	NUI	DU	Nominated	Total
Fianna Fáil	4	6	3	5	6	0	0	6	30
Fine Gael	3	4	2	3	4	0	0	0	16
Labour Party	0	1	0	1	1	0	0	0	3
Independent	0	0	0	0	0	3	3	5	11
Total	7	11	5	9	11	3	3	11	60

== List of senators ==
- Note: The entries for Senators who were elected or appointed to fill vacancies are shown in italics

Name	Panel	Party	Notes
Katharine Bulbulia	Administrative Panel	Fine Gael	
Michael Doherty	Administrative Panel	Fianna Fáil	
Joe Doyle	Administrative Panel	Fine Gael	Elected to 26th Dáil at general election on 15 June 1989
Seán Haughey	Administrative Panel	Fianna Fáil	
Tras Honan	Administrative Panel	Fianna Fáil	
Patrick Kennedy	Administrative Panel	Fine Gael	
Mary Wallace	Administrative Panel	Fianna Fáil	Elected to 26th Dáil at general election on 15 June 1989
Paul Bradford	Agricultural Panel	Fine Gael	Elected to 26th Dáil at general election on 15 June 1989
John Connor	Agricultural Panel	Fine Gael	Elected to 26th Dáil at general election on 15 June 1989
Michael Ferris	Agricultural Panel	Labour	Elected to 26th Dáil at general election on 15 June 1989
Tom Fitzgerald	Agricultural Panel	Fianna Fáil	
Thomas Hussey	Agricultural Panel	Fianna Fáil	
Rory Kiely	Agricultural Panel	Fianna Fáil	
Pádraic McCormack	Agricultural Panel	Fine Gael	Elected to 26th Dáil at general election on 15 June 1989
Charles McDonald	Agricultural Panel	Fine Gael	
Patrick McGowan	Agricultural Panel	Fianna Fáil	
Martin O'Toole	Agricultural Panel	Fianna Fáil	Elected to 26th Dáil at general election on 15 June 1989
William Ryan	Agricultural Panel	Fianna Fáil	
Seán Byrne	Cultural and Educational Panel	Fianna Fáil	
Joachim Loughrey	Cultural and Educational Panel	Fine Gael	
Maurice Manning	Cultural and Educational Panel	Fine Gael	
Tony McKenna	Cultural and Educational Panel	Fianna Fáil	
Paschal Mooney	Cultural and Educational Panel	Fianna Fáil	
Eddie Bohan	Industrial and Commercial Panel	Fianna Fáil	
Tony Bromell	Industrial and Commercial Panel	Fianna Fáil	Elected at by-election on 19 December 1988 after death of Jack Daly
Jack Daly	Industrial and Commercial Panel	Fine Gael	Died on 5 May 1988
Seán Fallon	Industrial and Commercial Panel	Fianna Fáil	
Willie Farrell	Industrial and Commercial Panel	Fianna Fáil	
Jack Fitzsimons	Industrial and Commercial Panel	Fianna Fáil	
Phil Hogan	Industrial and Commercial Panel	Fine Gael	Elected to 26th Dáil at general election on 15 June 1989
Mick Lanigan	Industrial and Commercial Panel	Fianna Fáil	
Brian O'Shea	Industrial and Commercial Panel	Labour	Elected to 26th Dáil at general election on 15 June 1989
Gerry Reynolds	Industrial and Commercial Panel	Fine Gael	Elected to 26th Dáil at general election on 15 June 1989
Donie Cassidy	Labour Panel	Fianna Fáil	
Denis Cregan	Labour Panel	Fine Gael	
Nuala Fennell	Labour Panel	Fine Gael	Elected to 26th Dáil at general election on 15 June 1989
Des Hanafin	Labour Panel	Fianna Fáil	
Jack Harte	Labour Panel	Labour	
Brian Hillery	Labour Panel	Fianna Fáil	Elected to 26th Dáil at general election on 15 June 1989
Peter Kelleher	Labour Panel	Fine Gael	
Dan Kiely	Labour Panel	Fianna Fáil	
Don Lydon	Labour Panel	Fianna Fáil	
Larry McMahon	Labour Panel	Fine Gael	
Brian Mullooly	Labour Panel	Fianna Fáil	
John A. Murphy	National University of Ireland	Independent	
Joe O'Toole	National University of Ireland	Independent	
Brendan Ryan	National University of Ireland	Independent	
David Norris	Dublin University	Independent	
Mary Robinson	Dublin University	Independent	
Shane Ross	Dublin University	Independent	
Séamus Cullimore	Nominated by the Taoiseach	Fianna Fáil	Elected to 26th Dáil at general election on 15 June 1989
Michael Dawson	Nominated by the Taoiseach	Fianna Fáil	Nominated to fill vacancy on 26 June 1989 after the 1989 general election
Éamon de Buitléar	Nominated by the Taoiseach	Independent	
George Eogan	Nominated by the Taoiseach	Independent	
Brian Friel	Nominated by the Taoiseach	Independent	
Paul Kavanagh	Nominated by the Taoiseach	Fianna Fáil	Nominated to fill vacancy on 26 June 1989 after the 1989 general election
John Magnier	Nominated by the Taoiseach	Independent	
Frank McDonnell	Nominated by the Taoiseach	Fianna Fáil	Nominated to fill vacancy on 26 June 1989 after the 1989 general election
John Robb	Nominated by the Taoiseach	Independent	
Tom McEllistrim	Nominated by the Taoiseach	Fianna Fáil	Elected to 26th Dáil at general election on 15 June 1989
Jimmy Mulroy	Nominated by the Taoiseach	Fianna Fáil	
Vivian O'Callaghan	Nominated by the Taoiseach	Fianna Fáil	
John O'Connell	Nominated by the Taoiseach	Fianna Fáil	Elected to 26th Dáil at general election on 15 June 1989
Nicholas O'Connor	Nominated by the Taoiseach	Fianna Fáil	

== Changes ==
Date	Panel	Loss	Gain	Note
5 May 1988	Industrial and Commercial Panel	Fine Gael		Death of Jack Daly
19 December 1988	Industrial and Commercial Panel		Fianna Fáil	Tony Bromell elected at by-election after the death of Jack Daly
15 June 1989	Agricultural Panel	Fine Gael		Paul Bradford elected to 26th Dáil at general election
15 June 1989	Agricultural Panel	Fine Gael		John Connor elected to 26th Dáil at general election
15 June 1989	Nominated by the Taoiseach	Fianna Fáil		Séamus Cullimore elected to 26th Dáil at general election
15 June 1989	Administrative Panel	Fine Gael		Joe Doyle elected to 26th Dáil at general election
15 June 1989	Labour Panel	Fine Gael		Nuala Fennell elected to 26th Dáil at general election
15 June 1989	Agricultural Panel	Labour		Michael Ferris elected to 26th Dáil at general election
15 June 1989	Labour Panel	Fianna Fáil		Brian Hillery elected to 26th Dáil at general election
15 June 1989	Industrial and Commercial Panel	Fine Gael		Phil Hogan elected to 26th Dáil at general election
15 June 1989	Agricultural Panel	Fine Gael		Pádraic McCormack elected to 26th Dáil at general election
15 June 1989	Nominated by the Taoiseach	Fianna Fáil		Tom McEllistrim elected to 26th Dáil at general election
15 June 1989	Nominated by the Taoiseach	Fianna Fáil		John O'Connell elected to 26th Dáil at general election
15 June 1989	Industrial and Commercial Panel	Labour		Brian O'Shea elected to 26th Dáil at general election
15 June 1989	Agricultural Panel	Fianna Fáil		Martin O'Toole elected to 26th Dáil at general election
15 June 1989	Industrial and Commercial Panel	Fine Gael		Gerry Reynolds elected to 26th Dáil at general election
15 June 1989	Administrative Panel	Fianna Fáil		Mary Wallace elected to 26th Dáil at general election
26 June 1989	Nominated by the Taoiseach		Fianna Fáil	Michael Dawson nominated to fill vacancy after the 1989 general election
26 June 1989	Nominated by the Taoiseach		Fianna Fáil	Frank McDonnell nominated to fill vacancy after the 1989 general election
26 June 1989	Nominated by the Taoiseach		Fianna Fáil	Paul Kavanagh nominated to fill vacancy after the 1989 general election
