= Edith Kate Dawson =

British pathologist

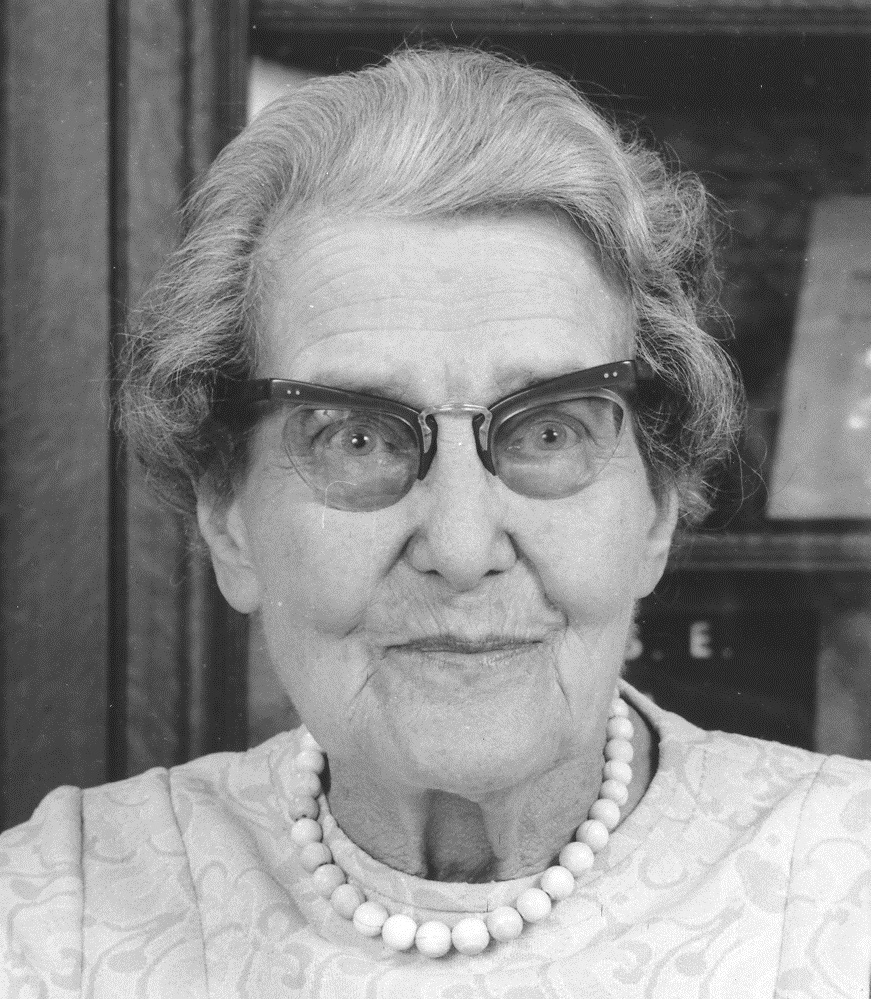
Edith Kate Dawson

Edith Kate Dawson MBE FRCSEd FRCPEd (1886–1983) was a pathologist who received a DSc for a thesis on sarcoma in 1970 (aged 84) and an MBE in 1968. Dawson carried out her research at both the Royal College of Surgeons of Edinburgh (undertaking much of her research at Surgeons' Hall) and the Royal College of Physicians of Edinburgh.

== Early life and education ==
Edith Dawson was born in India to a military family. Prior to studying medicine she held a teaching appointment in a missionary school in Rangoon (now Yangon). She travelled to Edinburgh via the Trans-Siberian Railway to study medicine; she graduated in 1921.

== Career and research ==
Dawson dedicated her career to studying pathology, initially as a cancer research fellow from 1931 at Edinburgh University. Her thesis on “Sarcoma of the Breast” 1970 was noted to be of ‘outstanding significance.’ Dawson later lectured at the Royal College of Surgeons of Edinburgh while also carrying out research at the laboratory. Throughout her career, she focused on the study of breast pathology, with special interest in fibrosis and adenosis.

In 1941, she was appointed as temporary part-time Assistant Histologist to the Laboratory at the Royal College of Physicians of Edinburgh.

From 1960, she moved to work at the Royal College of Surgeons of Edinburgh. In addition to performing the diagnostic histology she undertook a research work on the material in the Museum and donated to the College a large quantity of histological material and specimens, including whole sections of breast and other organs, some specially mounted for demonstration purposes. Several of these are still on display in the museum and a reference library which is publicly available.

== Personal life ==
She was married to pathologist James Walker Dawson, who was renowned for his work on multiple sclerosis, and who was pathologist to the RCP Laboratory.

The Royal College of Surgeons of Edinburgh Archive holds the Dawson Archive, which represents all aspects of her career. Collection items include substantial papers concerning the full research process, including correspondence; clinical notebooks and research notes, including notebooks with remarks on scientific papers regarding many forms of cancer, and clinical notes on cancer therapy; thesis notes; pathological drawings and photographs (including clinical and pathological images); glass slides of breast carcinoma samples; and patient case notes. In addition, Surgeons’ Hall Museums holds Dawson's histology collection of thousands of slides of a variety of systems.

== Awards and honours ==
In 1933, she was awarded the Lister Fellowship by the Royal College of Physicians of Edinburgh for her research work on malignant tumours of the breast.

- 1968, Member, Order of the British Empire
