= Robert Gerle =

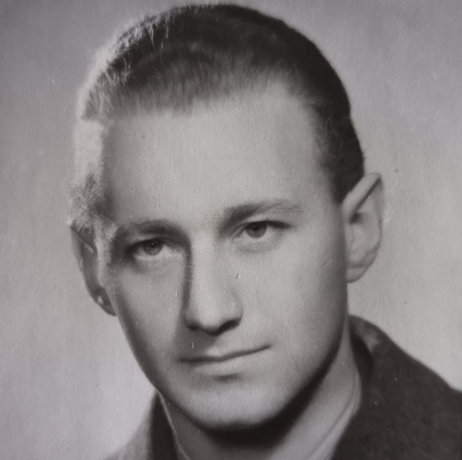

Robert Gerle (1 April 1924 – 29 October 2005) was an American classical violinist and music educator of Hungarian origin.

== Life ==
Born in Abbazia, Gerle was a violin student of Géza de Kresz. He studied at the Franz Liszt Academy of Music and at the Hungarian National Conservatory. As a Jew he came during the Second World War to a labour camp, from which he fled in 1945. Via Paris he came to Luxembourg, where he worked for a short time as a radio soloist. In 1950 he came to the US as a scholarship holder of the University of Illinois. In the 1960s he appeared as a violin soloist in the US and Europe and recorded works by Ludwig van Beethoven, Samuel Barber and others.

In 1965, he was a soloist with the Naumburg Orchestral Concerts, in the Naumburg Bandshell, Central Park, in the summer series.

For his performance of all Beethoven sonatas for violin and piano with his wife, the pianist Marilyn Neeley, he received an Emmy Award for television in 1970. In the same year he married Neeley. Gerle taught violin at the Peabody Institute in Baltimore and at the Mannes School of Music in New York. From 1972 he taught at the University of Maryland, Baltimore County and at the Catholic University of America. He also conducted the Friday Morning Music Club and the Washington Sinfonia.

Gerle published the violin textbooks The Art of Bowing Practice (1991) and The Art of Practicing the Violin (1983) as well as memoirs entitled Playing It by Heart: Wonderful Things Can Happen Any Day (2005).

Gere died in Hyattsville, Maryland, at age 81.
