= James Dawson =

James Dawson may refer to:

- James Dawson (activist) (1806–1900), prominent champion of Aboriginal interests
- James Dawson (footballer, born 1890) (1890–1933), Scottish football striker
- James Dawson (politician) (1823–1886), Ontario political figure
- James Lennox Dawson (1891–1967), Scottish recipient of the Victoria Cross
- James Walker Dawson (1870–1927), Scottish pathologist
- James Frederick Dawson (1874–1941), American landscape architect
- Juno Dawson (formerly James Dawson, born 1981), British author
- Jerry Dawson (footballer, born 1909) (James Dawson, 1909–1977), Scottish football goalkeeper

== See also ==
- Jimmy Dawson (disambiguation)
