= John Dawson =

John, Johnny, or Johnnie Dawson may refer to:

== Arts and entertainment ==
- John Dawson, actor played Mr. Mumford in Rentaghost
- John Dawson (musician) (1945–2009), American singer and guitarist with the New Riders of the Purple Sage

== Politics and law ==
- John Dawson (Virginia politician) (1762–1814), American politician, U.S. representative from Virginia
- John Dawson Jr. (1765–1823), intendant (mayor) of Charleston, South Carolina
- John Bennett Dawson (1798–1845), American politician, U.S. representative from Louisiana
- John L. Dawson (1813–1870), American politician, U.S. representative from Pennsylvania
- John W. Dawson (1820–1877), American politician, governor of Utah Territory
- John A. Dawson (Canadian politician) (1826–1902), member of Canadian House of Commons from Pictou
- John Dawson (Australian politician) (fl. 1861), member of the New South Wales Legislative Council
- John Shaw Dawson (1869–1960), Justice of the Kansas Supreme Court
- John R. Dawson (1950–2003), United States Ambassador to Peru
- John Dawson (fl. 2010), candidate in the 2010 United States House of Representatives elections in Illinois

== Science and medicine ==
- John Dawson (surgeon) (1734–1820), British mathematician and surgeon
- John Frederic Dawson (1802–1870), English entomologist and taxonomist
- John William Dawson (1820–1899), Canadian geologist
- John Dawson (botanist) (1928–2019), New Zealand botanist
- John M. Dawson (1930–2001), American computational physicist
- John Leonard Dawson (1932–1999), British physician, Serjeant Surgeon to the Royal Household
- John W. Dawson Jr. (born 1944), American mathematician

== Sports ==
- John Dawson (cricketer, born 1871) (1871–1948), English cricketer
- Johnny Dawson (1902–1986), American amateur golfer
- Johnnie Dawson (1914–1984), American Negro leagues baseball player
- Peter Dawson (cricketer) (John Peter Dawson, 1946–2012), English cricketer

== Others ==
- John Dawson, 1st Earl of Portarlington (1744–1798), Irish peer
- John Dawson, 2nd Earl of Portarlington (1781–1845), Irish peer
- John Dawson (slave trader) (died 1812), British slave trader
- John Barkley Dawson (1830–1918), American rancher, namesake of Dawson, New Mexico
- John A. Dawson (geographer), British academic in the fields of geography and marketing

== See also ==
- Jack Dawson (disambiguation)
