= Michael Doherty (Irish politician) =

Irish politician (1929–2011)

Senator
- In office 25 April 1987 – 1 November 1989
- Constituency: Administrative Panel

Personal details
- Born: 29 June 1929 County Longford, Ireland
- Died: 21 December 2011 (aged 82) County Longford, Ireland
- Party: Fianna Fáil

Michael Doherty (29 June 1929 – 21 December 2011) was an Irish politician in the Fianna Fáil party. He was a senator from 1987 to 1989.

A native of Esker, Ballinalee, County Longford, Doherty entered local politics in 1967 serving as a county councillor for over two decades before eventually stepping down from public life in the mid 1990s.

An auctioneer by profession, he was a senator from 1987 to 1989 after securing election to the 18th Seanad's administrative panel. Doherty was closely aligned to then Taoiseach Albert Reynolds becoming a special advisor upon the latter's election in 1992.

Doherty was elected in 1987 to the 18th Seanad on the Administrative Panel, but was defeated in the 1989 election to the 19th Seanad.
