= Frank McDonnell (Irish politician) =

Irish politician

Senator
- In office 26 June 1989 – 1 November 1989
- Constituency: Nominated by the Taoiseach

Personal details
- Political party: Fianna Fáil

Frank McDonnell is an Irish former politician. He briefly served as a Fianna Fáil member of the 18th Seanad. He was nominated by the Taoiseach Charles Haughey, on 26 June 1989, to fill a vacancy after the 1989 general election. He did not contest the 1989 Seanad election.
