= Michael Dawson (businessman) =

Irish entrepreneur and politician

Senator
- In office 26 June 1989 – 1 November 1989
- Constituency: Nominated by the Taoiseach

Personal details
- Political party: Fianna Fáil
- Spouse: Pauline Dawson
- Children: 2

Michael Dawson is a businessman and former politician from County Dublin in Ireland. He is the founder and CEO of Gift Voucher Shop.

== Career ==
Dawson served briefly as a senator in 1989, when he was nominated by the Taoiseach to the 18th Seanad to fill a vacancy after the 1989 general election.

In 2002, he founded he Gift Voucher Shop (GVS), an international company that created the Multi-Retailer Gift Card.

Dawson was one of finalists in the 2007 Ernst & Young Entrepreneur of the Year programme. In 2010, he was named "Fingal Business Person of the Year" at the Business Excellence Awards 2010.

In November 2018, Dawson sold his share of the Gift Voucher Shop to Fintech Blackhawk Network when the company purchased the One4all gift voucher business.

== Personal life ==
He lives in Malahide, County Dublin. Dawson was married to Pauline and together they had three sons. Pauline died in 2014 from cancer.
