= Walt Dawson =

American activist

Walter Dawson (born April 26, 1982, in Portland, Oregon) is an Alzheimer's disease activist. He is the son of British immigrant Cecil Dawson and Oregon native Clara Dawson. As a young boy, Dawson captured the attention of America's leaders and national media by undertaking a letter writing campaign on behalf of his father and others with Alzheimer's. In 1992, Dawson became a national spokesperson for the Alzheimer's Association. In this role, Dawson traveled to Washington, D.C. several times to testify before the United States Senate and House of Representative committees about his family's experiences. While in Washington, Dawson was granted access to several senior legislators and public officials including President Bill Clinton and Vice-President Al Gore.

== Overview ==
Dawson began his letter-writing campaign after the cost of his father's long care placed the family in serious financial peril. National Public Radio became the first nationwide media outlet to support his original letter-writing campaign, after Dawson (aged 9) read one of his letters on the air. Soon afterwards, NBC, CBS and Nickelodeon picked up the story of Dawson's campaign on behalf of his father and other people with Alzheimer's disease. They covered the Dawson family and their struggle for health care reform over numerous programs, gaining national exposure for the issues that mattered to people with the disease and their families.

== Early adulthood ==
While an undergraduate at the University of Portland, Dawson was elected student body vice-president and served as President of the Student Senate.
