= Jack Dawson =

Jack Dawson may refer to:

- Jack Dawson (Australian rules footballer) (1885–1964), Australian rules footballer
- Jack Dawson (rugby league), Australian rugby league player
- Jack Dawson (long distance runner), Northern Irish marathon runner
- Jack Dawson, a fictional character in the 1997 film Titanic, played by Leonardo DiCaprio

== See also ==
- John Dawson (disambiguation)
