= James Walker Dawson =

Scottish pathologist

James Walker Dawson (1870, India - 26 June 1927, Edinburgh) was a Scottish pathologist remembered for his work on multiple sclerosis including the description of the eponymous Dawson's fingers.

== Biography ==
James Dawson started his medical training at the University of Edinburgh in 1888, but had to interrupt his studies due to tuberculosis. He spent 13 years overseas, mainly in India, the United States, Canada and New Zealand, and worked as a lumberjack and sheep farmer during that time. In 1903 he resumed his training, and graduated MB CM the next year. He started research into disorders of the nervous system at the Royal College of Physicians of Edinburgh under Alexander Bruce. In 1907 he presented a thesis for the Syme Surgical Fellowship which was awarded in 1910. In 1911 he was awarded his MD with a gold medal for his thesis Studies on Inflammation. He was unable to serve in World War I due to ill health, so taught pathology at the University of Edinburgh.

Bruce died unexpectedly, and Dawson continued the research on his own. In 1916 he published a landmark paper on the histology of "disseminated sclerosis", describing the distribution and stages of lesions, reviewing theories on the aetiology and describing the inflammatory process seen in the disease. This work formed the basis for his DSc thesis in the same year. In his book The Founders of Neurology which was published in 1953, W. Haymaker stated that little had been added to this work in the intervening 40 years.

He declined a number of appointments, again due to ill health, and continued working as a histologist in the laboratory at the Royal College of Physicians in Edinburgh. He produced publications including work on multiple neuromata of the central nervous system, generalised osteitis fibrosa, melanomata and syringomyelia. He became a Fellow of the Royal College of Physicians in 1924, and also published an address on The Spirit of Leisure and the Spirit of Work which was presented to Edinburgh medical students for many years. He was preparing three Morison Lectures for presentation to the Royal College of Physicians at the time of his death in 1927.

James Dawson was married to Edith Kate Dawson, who was also a pathologist of international repute.
