= Peter Dawson =

Peter Dawson may refer to:

== People ==
- Peter Dawson (bass-baritone) (1882–1961), Australian bass-baritone who gained worldwide renown in the 1920s and 1930s
- Peter Dawson, chief winemaker of the Hardy Wine Company
- Peter Dawson (politician) (1892–1963), Canadian politician
- Peter Dawson (cyclist) (born 1982), Australian Olympic cyclist
- Peter Dawson (golfer) (born 1950), English golfer
- Peter Dawson (cricketer) (1946–2012), English cricketer
- Peter Dawson (swimmer) (born 1957), Australian Olympic swimmer
- Peter Dawson (priest) (1929–2013), Archdeacon of Norfolk
- Peter Dawson (trade unionist) (1940–2005), Welsh trade union leader

== Characters ==
- Peter Dawson, character in the film Heathers, played by Jeremy Applegate
- Peter Dawson, character in the Rising Stars comic book
- Peter Dawson, character in Black Museum (Black Mirror)
