= Charlie Dawson =

English footballer

Personal information
- Full name: Charlie Henry Dawson
- Date of birth: 7 April 1883
- Place of birth: Ashton-in-Makerfield, England
- Position: Winger

Senior career*
Years	Team	Apps	(Gls)
1905–1906	Ashton Town		
1906–1910	Preston North End	67	(23)
1910	Ashton Town		
Total		67	(23)
- * Club domestic league appearances and goals

Charlie Henry Dawson (born 7 April 1883) was an English footballer who played in the Football League for Preston North End.
