= Coningsby Dawson =

American novelist

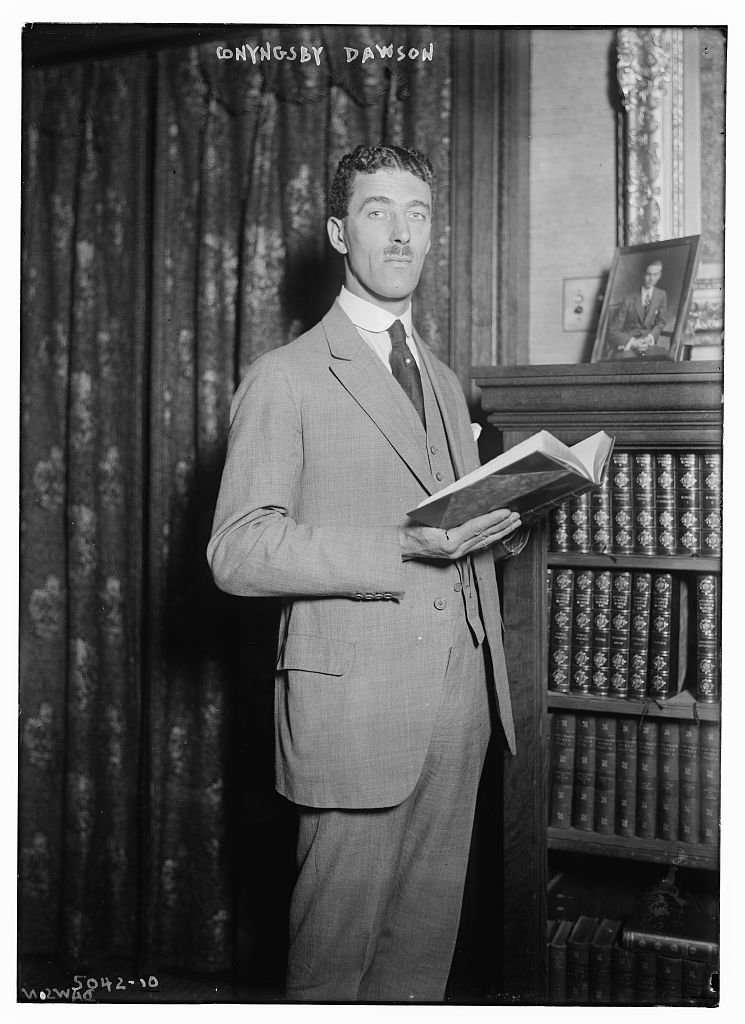
- Dawson in 1919
- Born: February 26, 1883; High Wycombe, Buckinghamshire, England
- Died: August 10, 1959 (aged 76)
- Relatives: Father, William James Dawson; mother Jane Dawson (nee Powell).
- Military career
- Allegiance: Canada
- Branch: Canadian Forces
- Rank: Lieutenant
- Nickname: Con

Coningsby Dawson (26 February 1883 – 10 August 1959) was an Anglo-American novelist and soldier of the Canadian Field Artillery, born at High Wycombe, Buckinghamshire, England.

== Education ==
Dawson attended Merton College, Oxford, matriculating in 1902 and taking a second class degree in Modern History in 1905. He spent a year taking a theological course at Union Seminary but decided on a career as a writer.

== Career ==
In the same year he went to America, where he did special work for English newspapers on Canadian subjects, traveling widely during the period. He lived at Taunton, Massachusetts, from 1906 to 1910, when he became literary adviser to the George H. Doran Publishing Company.

At his parents' home in Taunton, Massachusetts, he wrote poems, short stories, and three novels: Garden Without Walls (1913), an immediate success, followed by The Raft and Slaves of Freedom. In 1906 while travelling in western Canada collecting material for magazine articles Coningsby stayed in Nelson, British Columbia. He was impressed with the beauty of the Kootenays and sent a telegram to his brother Reg, encouraging him to come west and try his hand at apple growing. Coningsby's father purchased 40 acres and Reg cleared the land, built a cabin and planted trees. The ranch, as it was called, became a summer destination for the family. In his wartime letters home Con fondly recalls the time spent at the ranch as he gazes at the Moon from the battlefield trenches.

== Military service ==
In 1914, he went to Ottawa, saw Sir Sam Hughes, and was offered a commission in the Canadian Field Artillery on the completion of his training at the Royal Military College of Canada, at Kingston, Ontario. "His long training at Kingston had been very severe. It included besides the various classes which he attended a great deal of hard exercise, long rides or foot marches over frozen roads before breakfast, and so forth."

In July 1916 he was selected, with twenty-four other officers, for immediate service in France. His younger brothers enlisted in the Naval Patrol, then being recruited in Canada by Commander Armstrong.

Lieutenant Coningsby Dawson joined the Canadian Expeditionary Force at the front in 1916, and continued in service until the end of World War I. He served in the Somme battlefield at Albert, at Thiepval, at Courcelette, and at the taking of the Regina trench.

=== Coningsby’s wartime article for the New York Times ===
During World War I, editors at the New York Times Book Review solicited essays from American and allied soldiers serving in Europe. The piece submitted by Lt. Coningsby was published on October 21, 1917 and opens as follows:

I have been asked to say something for the New York Times Book Review on literature in the trenches. There isn’t any. There isn’t any in the sense that people living in America would understand. The life that men lead in the trenches is greater literature than was ever penned...

The essay closes with a description of allied gunners who died manning their batteries in support of infantry units under attack by German forces. The gunners fought while enduring a barrage of enemy poison gas shells; many of the men felt compelled to remove their gas masks in order to accurately load and site their artillery:

The unmasked men lasted about 20 minutes; when they had been done others removed their only protection and followed their example. This went on for two hours…The spirit of the new literature after peace is declared is going to be the spirit of those gunners...

== Civilian career ==
After having been wounded he came twice to the United States (1917, 1918) on lecture tours. On behalf on the British Ministry of Information, he investigated in 1918 the American military preparedness in France.

In 1919, he went to England to study European reconstruction problems, and subsequently lectured on the subject of the United States. He also visited and reported on the devastated regions of Central and Eastern Europe at the request of Herbert Hoover.

He also edited, with his father W. J. Dawson, The Reader's Library, and Best Short Stories (1923).

== Works ==
- The Worker and Other Poems (1906)
- The House of Weeping Women (1908)
- Murder Point (1910)
- The Road to Avalon (1911)
- The Garden Without Walls (1913)
- Florence on a Certain Night and other Poems (1914)
- The Raft (1914)
- The Unknown Country (1915)
- Slaves of Freedom (1916)
- The Seventh Christmas (1917, 1921)
- Carry On: Letters in Wartime (1917)
- The Glory of the Trenches. An Interpretation (1918)
- Out to Win (1918)
- Living Bayonets (1919)
- The Test of Scarlet (1919)
- The Little House (1920)
- It Might Have Happened to You (1921)
- The Kingdom Round the Corner (1921, 1923)
- The Vanishing Point (1922)
- Christmas Outside Eden (1922)
- The Moon Through Glass (1934)
- Inspiration Valley (1935)

== Sources ==
- New York Times Book Review, 2021. New York Times Book Review: 125 of Literary History. Tina Jordan with Noor Qasim, editors. Clarkson Potter Publishers, New York. Random House. ISBN 978-0-593-23461-7
- Dawson, Coningsby. 1917. “LITERATURE IN THE TRENCHES; By Lieutenant CONINGSBY DAWSON (Author of "Carry On," &c.)” New York Times Book Review, October 21, 1917.https://www.nytimes.com/1917/10/21/archives/literature-in-the-trenches-by-lieutenant-coningsby-dawson-author-of.html Accessed 16 August 2026.
