= Sandra Dawson =

Sandra Dawson may refer to:

- Sandra Dawson (academic) (born 1946), British social scientist and academic
- Sandra Dawson (cricketer) (born 1962), Irish cricketer
- Sandra Dawson (runner) (born 1970), Australian runner
