= Seriality =

Social construct

A seriality is a social construct that differs from a mere group of individuals. Serialities take the form of labels that are either imposed onto persons or voluntarily adopted by them. A seriality can be "unbound" and self-identified, such as workers, patriots, or anarchists, or "bound" and identified by authority census and elections, such as Asian-Americans or Tutsis.

Benedict Anderson described bound seriality as an insidious power grab by political authority. When a state gains an interest in power, it may serialize their citizens to identify them such as by forcing citizens to adopt a family name or, more recently, a national identification number.

== See also ==
- Patronymic
- Matronymic
- Family name

== See also ==
- Critique of Dialectical Reason
