= Richard Dawson (disambiguation) =

Richard Dawson (1932–2012) was an English-born American actor, comedian, game show host and panelist.

Richard Dawson may also refer to:

- Richard Dawson (died 1766), Irish MP
- Richard Dawson (British Army officer) (died c. 1800), soldier and administrator
- Richard Dawson (1762–1807), Irish MP
- Richard Thomas Dawson, 2nd Baron Cremorne (1788–1827), Irish MP and peer
- Richard Dawson, 1st Earl of Dartrey (1817–1897), Anglo-Irish Liberal, and later Liberal Unionist, politician
- Richard A. Dawson (1848–1906), American lawyer and politician
- Richard Dawson (racehorse trainer) (1865–1955), Irish owner and trainer of racehorses
- Richard Dawson (1855–1923), Irish barrister and Conservative Party politician
- Richard Dawson (footballer, born 1960), English professional footballer
- Richard Dawson (footballer, born 1962), English professional footballer
- Richard Dawson (footballer, born 1967), English professional footballer
- Richard Dawson (cricketer) (born 1980), English cricketer
- Richard Dawson (musician), English folk singer
- Richard J. Dawson, British civil engineer and academic
