= George Dawson =

George Dawson may refer to:

== Politicians ==
- George Dawson (Northern Ireland politician) (1961–2007), Northern Ireland politician
- George Walker Wesley Dawson (1858–1936), Canadian politician
- George Oscar Dawson (1825–1865), Georgia politician and Confederate officer
- George Robert Dawson (1790–1856), Anglo-Irish Tory politician

== Others ==
- George Dawson (author) (1898–2001), American author, learned to read at age 98
- George Dawson (businessman) (1907–1985), British businessman and convicted fraudster
- George Dawson (cricketer) (1799–1843), English cricketer
- George Dawson (preacher) (1821–1876), English preacher and civic activist
- George Dawson (trainer) (1853–1913), British racehorse trainer
- George Geoffrey Dawson (1874–1944), English editor of The Times
- George Mercer Dawson (1849–1901), Canadian surveyor for whom Dawson City, Yukon is named
- George William Dawson, Confederate officer from Alabama, first captain of the Perote Guards
- George Dawson (boxer) (1867–?), Australian boxer
- George Dawson (builder) (1821–1889), English builder, property developer and alderman
