= Artie Dawson =

Australian rules footballer

Personal information
- Full name: Arthur Dawson
- Born: 17 June 1891; Scoresby, Victoria
- Died: 17 July 1982 (aged 91); Moorabbin, Victoria
- Original team: Brighton (VFA)

Playing career^{1}
Years	Club	Games (Goals)
1918–1919, 1921	St Kilda	20 (9)
- ^{1} Playing statistics correct to the end of 1921.

Arthur Dawson (17 June 1891 – 17 July 1982) was an Australian rules footballer who played for the St Kilda Football Club in the Victorian Football League (VFL).
