= Digger Dawson =

English footballer

Personal information
- Full name: William John Dawson
- Date of birth: 1905
- Place of birth: Newbiggin-by-the-Sea, Northumberland, England
- Height: 5 ft 9 in (1.75 m)
- Position: Full back

Senior career*
Years	Team	Apps	(Gls)
–1930	Newbiggin West End		
1930–1931	Carlisle United	18	(0)
1931–1933	Crewe Alexandra	54	(0)
1933–1934	York City	28	(1)
1934–	Workington		
Total		100	(1)
- * Club domestic league appearances and goals

William John "Digger" Dawson (1905 – ?) was an English professional footballer who played as a full back in the Football League for Carlisle United, Crewe Alexandra and York City and in non-League football for Newbiggin West End and Workington.
