= Zoe Dawson =

- Born: Zoe Dawson; 30 January 1979 (age 47); Walsall, West Midlands, England
- Occupation: Actress
- Years active: 1999–present

Zoe Dawson is an English actress. Best known for minor roles in the BBC soap opera, Doctors.

== Career ==
Dawson started her career in 1999 as Susie in Oklahoma!, and then moved to International Docu-drama series, Mayday in 2004, where she played the British Airways stewardess Sue Gibbons. In 2006 Dawson had a one-off role playing Sally in The Bill, and after that she moved to UK soap opera. In 2006 and 2008 Dawson had one-off roles on the BBC popular soap opera, Doctors. In 2006 she played Louise Meecham, and in 2008 she played a hotel receptionist. Dawson also had a one-off role of playing another receptionist in the ITV soap, Coronation Street, in 2008.

== Specialist accents ==
Dawson can perform in many dialects and accents of the United Kingdom. They are;

- Black Country, Native
- Brummie
- Yorkshire
- Cockney
- West Country
- Geordie

== Personal life ==
Dawson was born and brought up in the Black Country town of Walsall, just north of Birmingham. Dawson currently still lives in Walsall.
