= Harry Medforth Dawson =

British professor of chemistry (1875–1939)

Harry Medforth Dawson (11 November 1875 – 9 March 1939) was an English physical chemist. He was a professor of physical chemistry at the University of Leeds. He studied chemical kinetics, reaction mechanisms involving complex ions and their equilibria. He was elected Fellow of the Royal Society in 1933.

Dawson was born in Bramley. He studied at Leeds Modern School and went to Yorkshire College with a Baines Scholarship. Under Arthurs Smithells he became interested in chemistry. After graduating in 1896 with a BSc he obtained the 1851 Exhibition and went to Germany to study at Berlin, Giessen and Leipzig where he studied under Jacobus Henricus van't Hoff, Karl Elbs and Richard Abegg. After receiving his doctorate from the University of Giessen, he returned to England in 1899 and joined Yorkshire College as a demonstrator. In 1905 he became a lecturer and received a DSc in 1907. In 1920 he became chair of physical chemistry and worked until his retirement. Dawson worked on iodination of ketones and examined the nature of acid catalysis.

Dawson married Phillis Mary Barr in 1907 and they had three sons and two daughters.
