= Brian Dawson =

Brian Dawson may refer to:

- Brian Dawson (general) (born 1954), Australian Army officer and museum administrator
- Brian Dawson (football coach) (born 1958), Australian rules football coach and academic
- Brian Dawson (folk singer) (1939–2013), British folk song collector, musician and singer
- Brian Dawson (darts player) (born 1968), English darts player
