= Thomas Dawson (soldier) =

American politician

General Thomas Dawson (January 25, 1784 – February 26, 1846) represented Greene County, Georgia in the state legislature.

He served as Captain in the War of 1812 and as Major under General Adams in the Creek War.

He was the first white child born in Greene County after it was formed. His parents were George Dawson and Ruth Skidmore. His eight children included William Curran Dawson.
