= Paul Wells (musician) =

American pianist, composer, music educator and writer

Paul Wells (July 22, 1888 – May 1927) was an American pianist, composer, music educator, and writer on music. Born in Carthage, Missouri, he was educated at the Peabody Institute at Johns Hopkins University. After solo appearances with the Baltimore Symphony Orchestra and the Minnesota Orchestra, he pursued further studies in Europe with Leopold Godowsky and Josef Lhévinne. He toured Europe in 1912 and 1913, during which time he made multiple appearances with the Berlin Philharmonic.

In fall 1913, Wells joined the faculty of the Toronto Conservatory of Music, where he taught until his death 14 years later. His pupils at the TCM included Gordon Hallett and Muriel Kerr. In Toronto he performed in numerous concerts and recitals, including as soloist with the Toronto Symphony Orchestra, as a member of the Conservatory Trio, and in concerts with the Toronto String Quartette. He died at the age of 38 in Jacksonville, Florida.
