= Bobby Dawson =

English footballer

Personal information
- Full name: Robert Dawson
- Date of birth: 31 January 1935
- Place of birth: South Shields, England
- Date of death: 1980 (aged 44–45)
- Place of death: Gateshead, England
- Position: Full back

Senior career*
Years	Team	Apps	(Gls)
19??–1953	South Shields		
1953–1955	Leeds United	1	(0)
1955–1960	Gateshead	118	(1)
- * Club domestic league appearances and goals

Robert Dawson (31 January 1935 – 1980) was an English footballer who played as a full back.

Dawson started his career with non-league South Shields before joining Leeds United in 1953. After only making 1 first team appearance, Dawson moved to Gateshead in 1955, where he scored 1 goal in 121 league and cup games. Dawson also had a trial spell at Manchester City in 1951.

== Sources ==
- "allfootballers.com". Archived from the original on 5 April 2010.
- "Bobby Dawson". Post War English & Scottish Football League A–Z Player's Transfer Database. Neil Brown.
