= Geralyn Dawson =

American novelist

Geralyn Dawson (also known as Emily March) is a USA Today bestselling author of romance novels. She is a graduate of Texas A&M University, and has written thirty-five novels and contributed two novellas to anthologies, one of which was on The New York Times Best Seller list. In 1996 her novel The Wedding Raffle was named as one of the "Best Romances of 1996" by the Detroit Free Press. She has also been awarded the Romantic Times Magazine's career achievement award. She lives in Texas with her husband and three children.

== Bibliography ==
=== As Geralyn Dawson ===
- The Texan's Bride (1993)
- Capture The Night (1993)
- Tempting Morality (1995)
- The Bad Luck Wedding Dress (1996)
- The Wedding Raffle (1996)
- The Wedding Ransom (1998)
- The Bad Luck Wedding Cake (1998)
- The Kissing Stars (1999)
- Simmer All Night (1999)
- Sizzle All Day (2000)
- The Bad Luck Wedding Night (2001)
- The Pink Magnolia Club (2002)
- My Big Old Texas Heartache (2003)
- My Long Tall Texas Heartthrob (2004)
- Her Bodyguard (2005)
- Her Scoundrel (2005)
- Her Outlaw (2007)

==== Anthologies ====
- Under The Boardwalk, Castaway (1999)
- A Season In The Highlands, Cold Feet (2000)

=== As Emily March ===
==== Eternity Springs ====
1. Angel's Rest (2011)
2. Hummingbird Lake (2011)
3. Heartache Falls (2011)
4. Lover's Leap (2011)
5. Nightingale Way (2012)
6. Reflection Point (2013)
7. Miracle Road (2013)
8. Dreamweaver Trail (2014)
9. Teardrop Lane (2015)
10. Heartsong Cottage (2015)
11. Reunion Pass (2016)
12. Christmas in Eternity Springs (2016)
13. A Stardance Summer (2017)
14. The First Kiss of Spring (2018)
15. The Christmas Wishing Tree (2018)
16. Jackson: The McBrides of Texas (2019)
17. Tucker: The McBrides of Texas (2020)
18. Boone: The McBrides of Texas (2020)
