= Leanne Dawson =

English academic

Academic background
- Education: University of Manchester: BA, 2004; MA, 2005; PhD, 2009

Academic work
- Discipline: Film studies and German studies

Leanne Dawson is an English academic in the fields of film studies and German studies. Her research often explores topics related to gender, sexuality and class. She is the editor of the collections Queering German Culture (2018) and Queer European Cinema (2019).

== Early life and education ==
Leanne Dawson grew up impoverished in North East England. She was the only person in her household family to continue education past age sixteen. She attended the University of Manchester, from which she earned a Bachelor of Arts in French and German Studies in 2004, a Master of Arts in European cultures in 2005, then a Doctor of Philosophy in 2009.

== Career ==
After graduating from university, Dawson began her career as a teaching fellow at Swansea University and the University of Leeds, then became a research fellow at the University of Edinburgh. Her research often explores topics related to gender, sexuality and class.

In addition to Dawson's work in academia, Dawson chaired the Scottish Queer International Film Festival and co-founded the Queer Screens Network.

== Selected publications ==
Dawson has authored published journal articles and book chapters, as well as edited special journal editions and two collections: Queering German Culture (2018) and Queer European Cinema (2019).

=== Queering German Culture (2018) ===
Published as the tenth volume in the Edinburgh German Yearbook series, Queering German Culture explores LGBT issues in Germany from a historical and contemporary context, looking both at representation and lived experiences. The collection consists of NUM parts: "Queer Histories and Archives", "Queering the Other", and "Queering Normativity".

Queering German Culture received mixed reviews in the academic literature.

In a review for Modern Language Review, Helen Finch discusses how Queering German Culture represents an uncommon connection between queer studies and German studies. Finch finds this connection important, given Germany's history with sexology, including people such as Karl Heinrich Ulrichs and Magnus Hirschfeld.

Robert Gillett, writing for the Journal of European Studies, had a less positive critique, writing, "This book is a cruel disappointment. So far from 'queering German culture', it spreads the meaning of 'queer' so thinly as to void it almost completely." Gillett specifically points to how the authors seemingly move between discussing the United States and Germany without problematizing these connections.

This concern was exemplified in a review by Domenic DeSocio, which discussed how the collection begins with discussing the legalization of same-gender marriage in the United States and Germany alongside the 2017 Unite the Right rally in Charlottesville, Virginia. Unlike Gillett, however, DeSocio noted that the discussion of issues beyond Germany presented insights for readers who were unfamiliar with the German context.

=== Queer European Cinema ===
Queer European Cinema explores LGBT representation in film within a European context. While analysing messaging within historical and contemporary media, the collection argues that media can serve to improve conditions for LGBT people while providing entertainment. FIlms discussed in the book include Hamam (1997), Boys Don't Cry (1999), Origine contrôlée (2001), Fine Dead Girls (2002), Fremde Haut (2005), Comme des voleurs (à l'est) (2006), Dirty Diaries (2009), Going South (2009) and Family Meals (2011). In a review for Synoptique, Olive Zeynep Kartal noted that while the book focuses on queer cinema, "the result is a queering of the notion of Europeanness, as well as developments in the understanding of queerness itself".

== Books ==
- Dawson, Leanne, ed. (2018). Queer European Cinema: Queering Cinematic Time and Space. Routledge. ISBN 978-0-367-23416-4.
- Dawson, Leanne, ed. (2018). Queering German Culture. Camden House. ISBN 978-1-571-13965-8.
