= Thomas Vesey Dawson (priest) =

Irish Anglican priest

Thomas Vesey Dawson (1768–1811) was an Anglican priest in Ireland during the late 18th and early centuries.

Dawson was born in Dublin; and educated at Trinity College, Dublin. He was Dean of Killala from 1795 until 1796; Archdeacon of Tuam from April to July 1806; and Dean of Clonmacnoise from July 1806 until his death. Dawson's elder brother Richard was the father of Richard Thomas Dawson, 2nd Baron Cremorne.
