= John A. Dawson (geographer) =

British marketing professor

John Alan Dawson is Professor of Marketing at the University of Edinburgh; he is a Geographer, and specialist in retail innovation,

Dawson graduated in geography from University College London in 1965 with an interest in urban geography. He then studied for an MPhil on central place theory and the work of the early economists, completing his formal education in 1970 with a PhD from the University of Nottingham with a thesis on the post-war changes in retailing in selected European regions.

He is a Fellow of the Royal Society of Scotland. He is a distinguished professor at the University of Marketing and Distribution Sciences in Kobe, Japan, and he holds a visiting professorship at ESADE Barcelona in Spain. He received a Senior Research Fellowship in 2005 from the Spanish Ministry of Education. He held the Japan Society for the Promotion of Science Fellowship in 2004 at Saitama University and in 2006 at Kobe University.

== Academic Posts ==
- 1971-1974 Lecturer in Geography, University of Wales, Lampeter.
- 1974-1981 Senior Lecturer in Geography, University of Wales, Lampeter
- 1981-1983 Reader in Geography, University of Wales, Lampeter
- 1983-1990 Fraser of Allander Chair of Distributive Studies and Director of Institute for Retail Studies, University of Stirling.
- 1993-1998 Head of Department of Business Studies, University of Edinburgh
- 1993-2009 Professor of Marketing, University of Edinburgh
