= Greg Dawson =

American journalist

- Born: 1950 (age 75–76); Bloomington, Indiana
- Education: Indiana University
- Occupations: Journalist, author
- Employer: The Orlando Sentinel
- Spouse: Cathy C. Dawson
- Children: Two children

Greg Dawson (1950) is an American columnist and author. Dawson has been in journalism for more than 50 years; he has worked as a reporter, a television critic, metro columnist, and consumer columnist.

His column, titled "The Last Resort," published in the Orlando Sentinel, answers questions trying to help companies and consumers resolve conflicts. Dawson, uses a humorous and sarcastic tone while answering consumer questions. In 2009 he published his first book, Hiding in the Spotlight: A Musical Prodigy's Story of Survival, 1941-1946.

Dawson was born in Bloomington, Indiana. He is married to Candy C. Dawson, and they have a son and a daughter.

== Biography ==
Dawson, a native of Bloomington, attended Bloomington high school. After graduation, he attended the Indiana University in Bloomington, but left a few semesters short of graduation; he had a job with the Daily Herald-Telephone, which was his first job in journalism. He and his wife, Candy, wrote a book, "Busted in Bloomington: A Tragedy in the Summer of '68," that described how the 60s was not a time of liberation, as many people believe. The story focused on a high school English teacher, who was forced to keep his sexual identity hidden, because being gay at the time was seen as taboo.

Dawson has worked as a reporter, television critic and columnist at newspapers in Indiana (Herald-Telephone and The Indianapolis Star), North Dakota (Grand Forks Herald), Massachusetts (Boston Herald), Kansas (Wichata Eagle), and Florida (Boca Raton News), during his 50 years in journalism.

Dawson originally started with the Orlando Sentinel in 1986 as a TV critic and became a local and state columnist in 1994. He left in 2000 to the Indianapolis Star, then returned in 2003. His column, titled "The Last Resort," answers questions to help companies and consumers resolve conflicts; often written in a humorous tone.

In 2009 he published his first book, Hiding in the Spotlight: A Musical Prodigy's Story of Survival, 1941-1946. The book tells the story of his mother, Zhanna Arshanskaya Dawson, who as a teenage girl escaped from the Holocaust along with her sister. The rest of their family was murdered. By assuming new identities and playing piano for German soldiers the sisters survived the holocaust and made their way to the United States.

A short documentary, also titled Hiding in the Spotlight, was written and directed by Dawsons wife, Candy; it was released in April 2010. Dawson narrates the short film; some of the documentary was filmed in Kharkiv, Ukraine.

== Bibliography ==
- Hiding in the Spotlight: A Musical Prodigy's Story of Survival, 1941-1946, Pegasus Books, 2009 A French edition was published in 2010, as well as an Italian edition, La pianista bambina (The child pianist), Piemme Editors, 2010. Another edition was released in Korea.
- Judgement Before Nuremberg: The Holocaust in the Ukraine and the First Nazi War Crimes Trial, Simon and Schuster, 2013
- Busted in Bloomington: A Tragedy in the Summer of '68, by Greg and Candy Dawson, Dog Ear Publishing, 2017
