= Marilyn Neeley =

American pianist (1937–2007)

Marilyn Neeley (December 26, 1937 – May 30, 2007) was an American pianist. She won the Los Angeles Times Woman of the Year in Music award in 1963 and an Emmy Award in 1970.

Neeley studied under Ethel Leginska and Muriel Kerr.
