= William Curran Dawson =

American politician

William Curran Dawson (September 17, 1818 - June 11, 1893) represented Russell County, Alabama in the state legislature in 1855. He fought in the Creek War of 1836 and was a merchant and planter at Glenville, Alabama. He was born in Greene County, Georgia, the son of Thomas Dawson.
