= Zhanna Arshanskaya Dawson =

Russian-American musician (1927–2023)

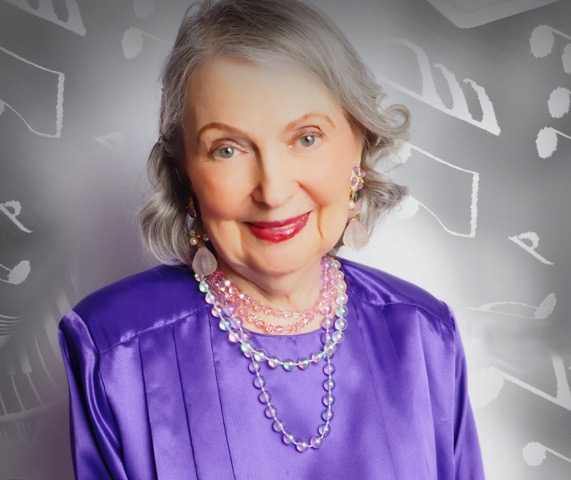
Zhanna A. Dawson

Zhanna Arshanskaya Dawson (born Janna Arshanskaya, April 1, 1927 – January 9, 2023) was a Russian-American pianist, Holocaust survivor and faculty member of the Jacobs School of Music at Indiana University (Bloomington). Dawson came to national prominence in 2009 after her son, journalist Greg Dawson published a book, Hiding in the Spotlight, chronicling her escape from the Holocaust. A middle-grade book, Alias Anna: A True Story of Outwitting the Nazis, by Susan Hood with Greg Dawson was published in 2022.

== Early life ==
Janna Arshanskaya was born in Berdyansk, Ukraine on April 1, 1927. She was the daughter of Sara and Dmitri Arshansky, a Jewish candy maker and amateur violinist from Berdyansk, a town in southeastern Ukraine. Her father bought her a German piano and enrolled her in piano lessons at age five. At six years old she made her performance debut, playing J.S. Bach's Two-Part Invention No. 1 on the radio. When Zhanna was eight her father's business failed and the family moved to the larger city of Kharkov. Both sisters were offered scholarships at the Moscow State Conservatory, St. Petersburg Conservatory and Kharkiv National University of Arts where they studied under Regina Horowitz, sister of famed pianist Vladimir Horowitz

== Holocaust ==
In 1941, Dawson and her family were living in Kharkov when the Germans invaded the Soviet Union and began to strategically and brutally kill Jews. All the Jews in Kharkov who had not left, more than 16,000, were grouped together by the Nazis and sent on a long forced march to be killed and buried in the ravine Drobitsky Yar near Kharkov. A mile from the ravine, her father bribed one of the guards by giving him a gold watch, so that he would allow Zhanna to escape. Zhanna hid among the crowd that had gathered to watch. She was later reunited with her sister Frina at the home of the Bogancha family in Kharkov (Frina has to date never revealed how she too escaped). The two concealed their Jewish identity by inventing a cover story on how their parents were killed, calling themselves Anna and Marina Morozova. They made their way to an orphanage in Kremenchuk, Ukraine to get official papers to certify their aliases where a piano technician noticed their talent, and introduced them to a theater director who was in charge of entertaining the Nazis. Thereafter, the sisters performed piano for Germans (who never knew they were Jews) throughout the war. Though several people accused them of not being who they said they were they were never caught.

== After the war ==
The Arshanskaya sisters wound up in a United Nations refugee camp at the end of the war. There, an American camp administrator, US Army Lt. Laurence Dawson heard the girls perform in a variety act He got them aboard the first ship of Holocaust survivors after the war. The girls were sent to Crozet, Virginia to live with Larry Dawson's wife, Grace. Through connections he was able to obtain an audition before Ernest Hutcheson, Rosalyn Tureck, and Muriel Kerr of the Juilliard School of Music, which offered them scholarships to attend. In 1947 Zhanna Arshanskaya and Larry Dawson's brother David, a violist, were married. They moved to Bloomington, Indiana in 1948, where she began to teach music at Indiana University and he played in the Berkshire String Quartet. David Dawson died in 1975.

Frina married Kenwyn Boldt, who was also a pianist, and worked at the State University of New York at Buffalo.

=== Revealing her story ===
In 1978 Dawson's son Greg was writing a column about Holocaust, a television miniseries, and asked his mother what it was like living during the time of the war. Dawson, who was a columnist for the Orlando Sentinel paper at the time, (currently writing for Winter Park Magazine) wrote his first book, Hiding in the Spotlight: A Musical Prodigy's Story of Survival, 1941-1946, about his mother's story. A subsequent book, Judgment Before Nuremberg; The Holocaust in Ukraine and the First Nazi War Crimes Trial, has extensive material about the dawn of the Holocaust as well as describing Zhanna's family's journey of discovery. The most recent book, Alias Anna: A True Story of Outwitting the Nazis by Susan Hood with Greg Dawson is narrated by Zhanna's granddaughter Aimée Dawson.

In 2006 Greg Dawson and his wife Candy traveled to Ukraine to see the site of the massacre. There they found the names of the entire Arshansky family, including Zhanna and Frina, etched on a memorial wall. It had been assumed that the two sisters had been killed along with the 16,000 other victims, because until then nobody was known to have survived. The Dawsons visited the Bogancha family at the home where Zhanna and Frina were hidden from the Nazis. They have stayed in touch with the descendants and in 2023 helped bring the great-great-grandson of the family to America where he is safe from the Russian invasion of Ukraine. Greg and Candy Dawson are on the board of the non-profit, Ukrainian Mothers and Children Transport Initiative, (UMACTransport.org) which gives pro bono legal aid and finds sponsorships for Ukrainian refugees.

=== Death ===
Dawson died on January 9, 2023, at the age of 95.
