= William Dawson (sportsman) =

English cricketer & rugby union player

William Arthur Dawson (3 December 1850 – 6 March 1916 (aged 65)) was an English first-class cricketer, who played one match for Yorkshire County Cricket Club in 1870. He bagged a pair in his only appearance against Kent at Dewsbury and did not bowl but did take a catch. Despite his lack of contribution, Yorkshire ran out comfortable winners by 82 runs, thanks largely to the bowling of Tom Emmett and George Freeman. He also appeared in a Leeds Clarence side in 1872. Dawson played rugby union for both Bradford and Yorkshire (1871–3).

Born in Bradford, Yorkshire, England, Dawson died in March 1916, in Ilkley, Yorkshire.
