= William Eddison Dawson =

William Eddison Dawson (October 1, 1829 – December 10, 1902) was an English-born businessman and political figure on Prince Edward Island, Canada. He was the seventh mayor of Charlottetown from 1878 to 1882 and from 1894 to 1898.

He was born in Leeds, the son of William Dawson and Mary Best. Dawson came to the island with his mother and family in 1843 following the death of his father. He worked as a clerk in a dry goods firm, becoming a partner in 1855. In the same year, he married Ann Ferrant Compton. Dawson opened his own business in 1863. He helped found the Union Bank of Prince Edward Island in 1863 and served as a director. He was also a county magistrate and a member of the school board. Dawson served as president of the Queens County Liberal-Conservative Association. Dawson died in Charlottetown at the age of 71.
