= William James Dawson =

English clergyman, lecturer, and author

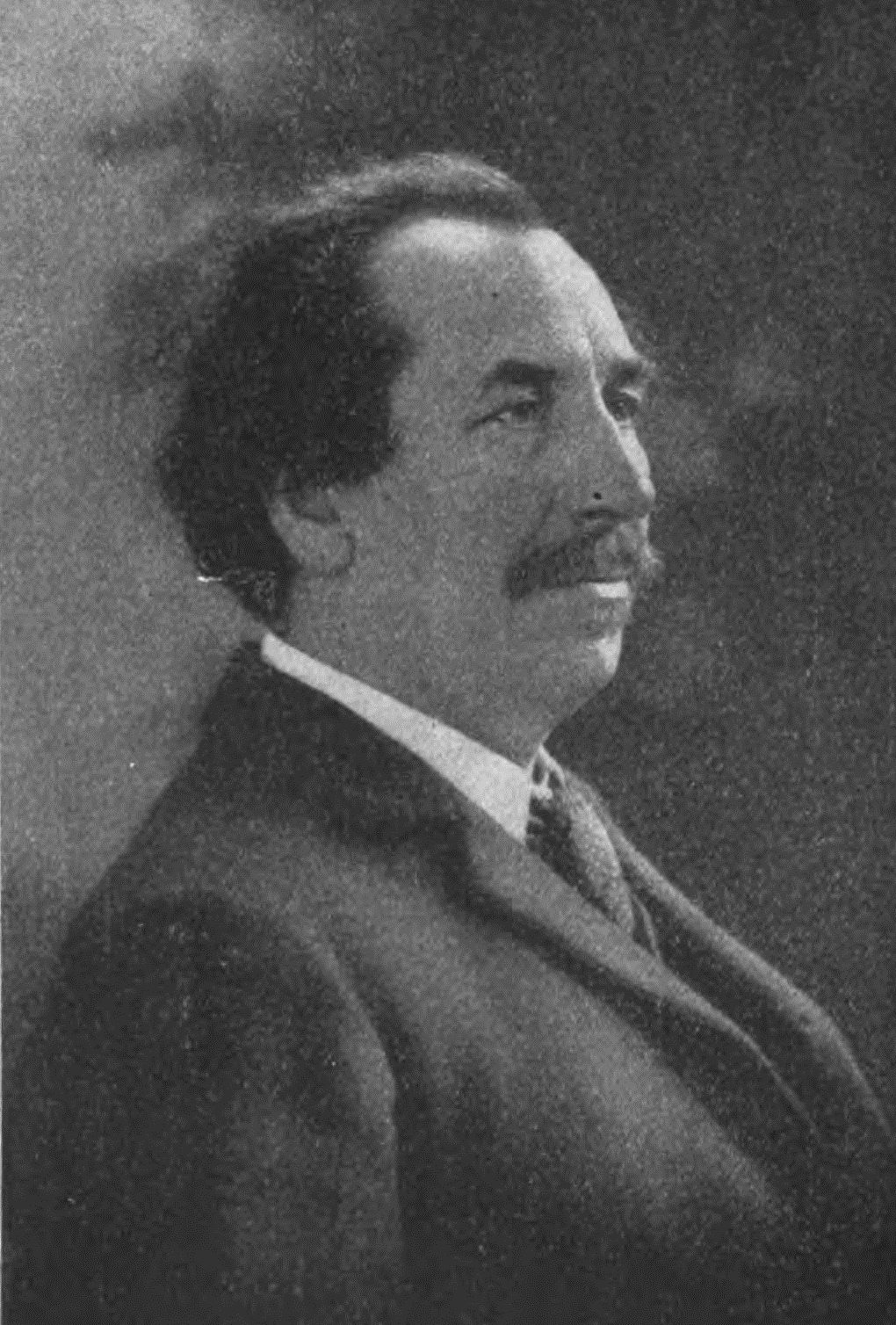
Portrait of William James Dawson

William James Dawson (21 November 1854 – 22 August 1928) was an English clergyman, lecturer, poet, hymnwriter, and author. After beginning his ministry as a Wesleyan Methodist, he became a Congregationalist in 1892. He was the pastor of Highbury Quadrant Congregational Church in the 1890s. During that time, his writing and preaching became widely popular in the United States, and he moved there in 1906, eventually settling in Newark, New Jersey.

He was the father of the novelist and poet Coningsby Dawson.

== Biography ==
=== Early life and education ===
William James Dawson was born on 21 November 1854 at Towcester, Northamptonshire to Reverend William James and Susan (née Waller) Dawson. He was educated at Kingswood School in Bath, Somerset and Didsbury College, Manchester.

=== Great Britain ===
He entered the Wesleyan ministry upon graduation from Didsbury in 1875. In 1884, he published his first work, a book of poetry titled, A Vision of Souls. This was followed by a collection of literary and critical essays, Quest and Vision, in 1886.

==== Wesley's Chapel, London (1887) ====
He began ministering at Wesley's Chapel, City Road, London in 1887. He found the conditions of South London extremely depressing and later wrote of its poverty in his Autobiography of the Mind, "All around these dismal habitations of the dead, were narrow alleys and foul rookeries, feculent with thronged and neglected human lives. The dilapidated houses looked as though they had known no cleansing or repair since the days of the Great Plague, when Bunhill Fields received the dead in thousands." During this period, he published his first novel, The Redemption of Edward Strahan. It received positive reviews, including praise from William Ewart Gladstone.

After only a year at Wesley's Chapel, Dawson accepted a vacant position at a church in Glasgow.

==== Glasgow (1888–92) ====
Dawson moved his family to 8 Queens Crescent, Glasgow in 1888, where he was minister of St. John's Chapel on Sauchiehall Street. Dawson later described the family home as "one of these grey stone houses, one of the twenty or thirty in a somber crescent, built round a mangy grass plot defended with rusty railing and adorned with a broken foundation, long ago derelict." He welcomed the change of scenery, contrasting the city to London in his later writing,

"In Glasgow, a different spirit reigned. Men were judged by their inherent worth. Society appeared to have a more democratic basis. I felt, for the first time, that I could breathe freely, move freely; that I was no longer badged, cataloged, and labeled. There was a more diffused intellectual life. Ideas counted for more. The common level of education was much higher than London. There was an ennobling tradition of the dignity of scholarship. The great university crowded with young from the farm and glen, who in due course would recruit to be all the learned professions, had done much to create this tradition."

His daughter Hilda also had fond memories of her father's time in Glasgow, which she referred to as his happiest and most successful years.

"Every Sunday morning he found a queue waiting outside his church, which was always crowded, both the morning and evening service. Glasgow University recognized the intellectual in him and he became a lecturer at the University and made such friends as Henry Drummond, John Caird and Lord Kelvin."

In 1891, Dawson made his first visit to the United States as a delegate to the Aecumenical Council of the Methodist Church. He later wrote, "The amazing magnitude of the country, the visible progress, the spirit of hope and energy in its people, affected me, as they affect all new-comers, with a kind of mental intoxication. This brief episode dropped a seed in my mind which was not lost. It struck a deep root, and twelve year later it bore unforeseen fruit."

==== Highbury Congregational Church, London (1892–1906) ====
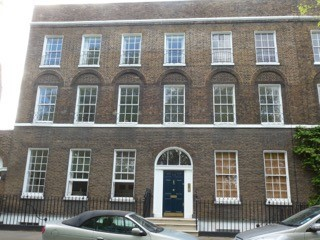
William James Dawson's family Highbury home in North London

In 1892, after returning to Britain, Dawson resigned his Wesleyan ministry and returned to Highbury, London to become a Congregational minister at Highbury Quadrant Congregational Church, one of the largest in London. Dawson later wrote, "The Congregational Church to which I was going gave a larger opportunity to a free individualism than any other church." However, he added that "it was merciless to failure, as my friends were quick to remind me."

Dawson's twelve years at Highbury were busy and transformative. He became a prolific writer, completing his works The Man Jesus Christ (also referred to as Life of Christ), The Quest of the Simple Life, and The House of Dreams. While his preaching was extremely popular and drew large crowds in London, his books were more successful in the United States, and The Quest of the Simple Life was read by Theodore Roosevelt. He also began writing short stories on advice from Arthur Conan Doyle. His most popular work, however, was an 1899 trilogy on English literature titled, The Makers of Modern English, which was widely sold and used as a textbook on modern literature.

Though he was convinced that he would remain at Highbury for the remainder of his life, his popularity in the United States soon drew him across the Atlantic Ocean.

=== United States of America (1904–24) ===
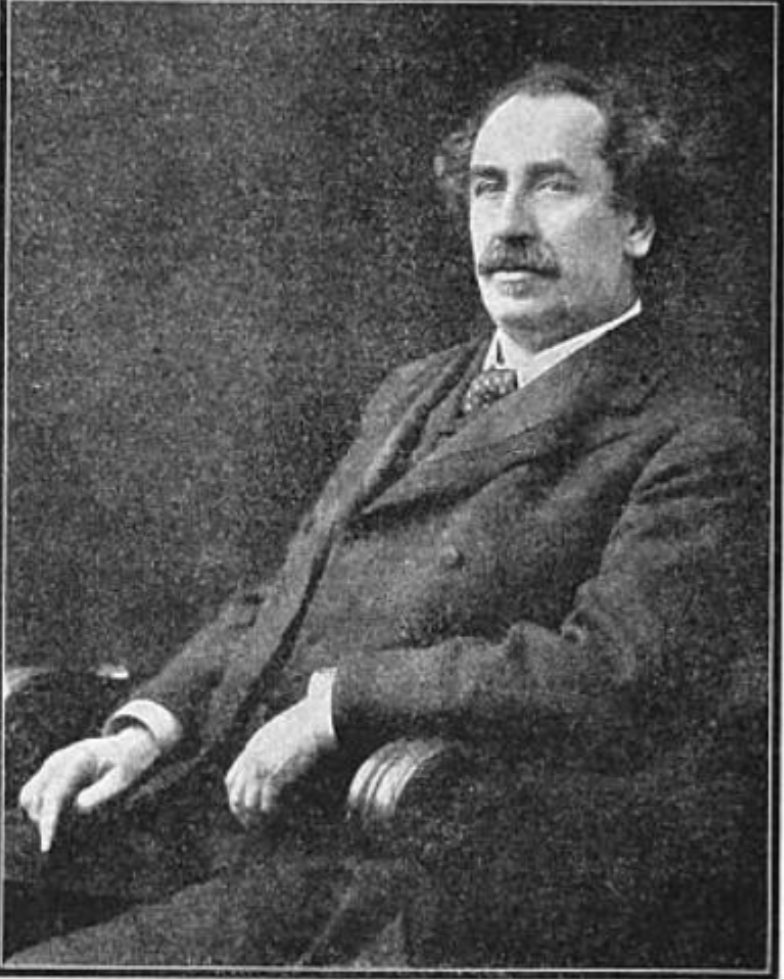
William James Dawson, photographed before 1907.

In autumn 1904, Dawson traveled to the United States to hold a series of services at Plymouth Church in Brooklyn, where his sermons were printed daily by the Brooklyn Eagle and later republished as The Evangelistic Note. Although he originally intended for it to be a short visit, his popularity demanded a series of public engagements, and he returned in 1905 for a prolonged preaching tour, with 70 thousand attending his sermons in the first six weeks. His sons Coningsby and Reggie had already made the crossing to attend Union Theological Seminary and Guelph Agricultural College, respectively, and on 6 May 1906, he relocated the remainder of his family to the United States permanently.

Dawson initially settled in Taunton, Massachusetts, where the family lived at 61 Summer Street, but he continued travelling throughout the United States as a lecturer and preacher until 1911. In 1912, he became the pastor of Old First Church in Newark, New Jersey, where he remained for the rest of his pastorate. During that time, he became an active figure in the civic life of Newark, with his church serving as an important symbol of the city's founding. At the 250th anniversary celebration, he delivered the Founders' Day oration, and he represented the city's Protestant churches in a united memorial service at Weequahic Park. While in Newark, he also published poetry about the United States and edited a widely used American hymnal, including several original hymns. He retired from the ministry in 1924.

== Personal life and death ==
The Dawson family summer home on Kootenay Lake, British Columbia, built in 1921.

Dawson married Jane Powell of Lowestoft in September 1879. They had six children:

- Muriel;
- Marjorie;
- Hilda;
- Eric Dawson;
- Reginald Dawson; and
- Coningsby Dawson, who became a successful author and poet in the United States.

In 1906, Coningsby and Reginald purchased 40 acres at Willow Point on the western arm of Kootenay Lake, north of Nelson, British Columbia, where Reginald built an orchard. The property became a favorite summer destination for the Dawson family.

Dawson died on 22 August 1928 at the Kootenay Lake property. In a prologue to his unfinished memoirs Twenty Years in America, his daughter Muriel wrote, "The last outdoor scene on which he looked on that afternoon on August 22 was his beloved mountains and lake with the evening shadows falling, as he sat on the terrace with little Derry (his grandchild) on his knee and pointed out to him the lake steamer come down the lake. They watched together till it vanished, then a sudden chill seized him, and he went indoors, never to come out again".

== Works ==
- Arvelon: a First Poem (1878)
- A Vision of Souls, with other Ballads and Poems (1884)
- Quest and Vision: Essays on Life and Literature (1886; enlarged, 1892)
- The Threshold of Manhood: a Young Man's Words to Young Men (1889)
- The Makers of Modern Poetry (1890)
- The Redemption of Edward Strahan: a Social Story (1891)
- The Church of To-morrow: a Series of Addresses Delivered in America, Canada, and Great Britain (1892)
- Poems and Lyrics (1893)
- The Makers of Modern English: a Popular Handbook to the Greater Poets of the Century (1893)
- The Making of Manhood (1894)
- London Idylls: Tales (1895)
- The Story of Hannah: a Novel (1896)
- Thro' Lattice-Windows: [tales] (1897)
- Judith Boldero: a Tragic Romance (1898)
- In Memoriam William Ewart Gladstone: A Sermon Preached in Highbury Quadrant Church, on Sunday Evening, May 22nd, 1898 (1898)
- Makers of Modern Prose: A Popular Handbook to the Greater Prose Writers of the Century (1899)
- Savonarola: a Drama (1900)
- The Man Christ Jesus: a Life of Christ (1901)
- The House of Dreams (1901)
- Literary Leaders of Modern England (1902)
- The Reproach of Christ, and Other Sermons (1903)
- Makers of English Fiction (1905)
- The Evangelistic Note (1905)
- The Forgotten Secret (1906)
- The Makers of English Poetry (1906)
- The Makers of English Prose (1906)
- The Empire of Love (1907)
- A Prophet in Babylon: A Story of Social Service (1907)
- The Quest of the Simple Life (1907)
- A Soldier of the Future (1908)
- The Great English Letter Writers - Volume 1 (1908)
- The Great English Essayists, with Introductory Essays and Notes (1909)
- Masterman and Son: [a Novel] (1909)
- The Divine Challenge (1910)
- The Great English Short Story Writers (1910)
- One Night in Bethlehem: a Christmas Story (1910)
- The Book of Courage (1911)
- A Child's Memorial by Her Father and Brother (1911)
- The Great English Novelists - Volume 2 (1911)
- The American Hymnal (1913)
- America, and Other Poems (1914)
- Robert Shenstone: a Novel (1917)
- The Father of a Soldier (1918)
- The War Eagle: a Contemporary Novel (1918)
- Chalmers Comes Back (1919)
- The Borrowdale Tragedy (1920)
- Dawson, William James (1925). The Autobiography of the Mind.
- Twenty Years in America (unpublished manuscript)
