= William Harbutt Dawson =

British journalist, civil servant and author

William Harbutt Dawson (27 July 1860 – 7 March 1948) was a British journalist, civil servant and author, and an acknowledged expert on German politics and society.

== Career ==
Dawson's first job was on the Craven Pioneer, a Liberal newspaper founded by his father and based at Skipton in Craven, then in the West Riding of Yorkshire. (The paper, after several changes of title and a merger with its Conservative rival, is now the Craven Herald & Pioneer.) Dawson went to Germany to complete his journalistic training, and later enrolled at Berlin University. He became interested in the welfare state that was being pioneered in Bismarck's Germany.

In 1888, following the death of his father, he returned to Skipton to succeed him as editor of the Pioneer. He also wrote articles for various other journals, as well as books, principally on Germany and its social policy. Dawson was therefore a natural choice to advise the Liberal government on setting up a social welfare system for the United Kingdom. He was hired by the Board of Trade, which was then under Lloyd George, initially on a temporary basis in 1909 and later for a permanent post. He consulted particularly with Emil Münsterberg, a leading German expert who advised several foreign governments on social security issues. Labour exchanges, pensions and national insurance were among the matters where Dawson contributed to government legislation.

During his time as a civil servant, Dawson published further important books on Germany. He served in the British delegation to the Versailles peace conference after World War I.

On his retirement in 1920, Dawson moved to Oxford and became a man of letters, continuing to write on Germany and other subjects. He was sufficiently well known for a letter addressed to "W. H. Dawson, Oxford" to reach him.

Several of Dawson's works became standard textbooks for university students in Germany, and have been reprinted since his death. His writings remain the object of study by German academics.

== Personal life ==
William Harbutt Dawson was born in Skipton, the third of eight children of John Dawson and Ann Hurd Harbutt (whose family included William Harbutt, the inventor of Plasticine). He was educated at local schools. He was married twice; both his wives were German. With his first wife Anna Clara Augusta née Gruetz he had a son. In 1913, the year after she died, he married Else, the only child of the late Emil Münsterberg; they had one son and three daughters.

== Selected works ==
- History of Skipton (1882, also modern reprints and a CD version)
- German Socialism and Ferdinand Lassalle: A Biographical History of German Socialistic Movements During This Century (1888)
- Bismarck and State Socialism: An Exposition of the Social and Economic Legislation of Germany since 1870 (1891)
- German Life in Town and Country (1901)
- Matthew Arnold and His Relation to the Thought of Our Time (1904)
- The Evolution of Modern Germany (1908)
- The Vagrancy Problem (1910)
- Social Insurance in Germany (1912)
- Municipal Life and Government in Germany (1914)
- The German Empire 1867-1914 and the Unity Movement (1919, 2 vols) Vol. 1 Vol. 2
- Richard Cobden and Foreign Policy: A Critical Exposition, with Special Reference to Our Day and Its Problems (1926)
- Germany Under The Treaty a detailed criticism of the Versailles Treaty and its implications (1933)
- Cromwell's Understudy: The Life and Times of General John Lambert and the Rise and Fall of the Protectorate (1938)
