= List of York City F.C. players (25–99 appearances) =

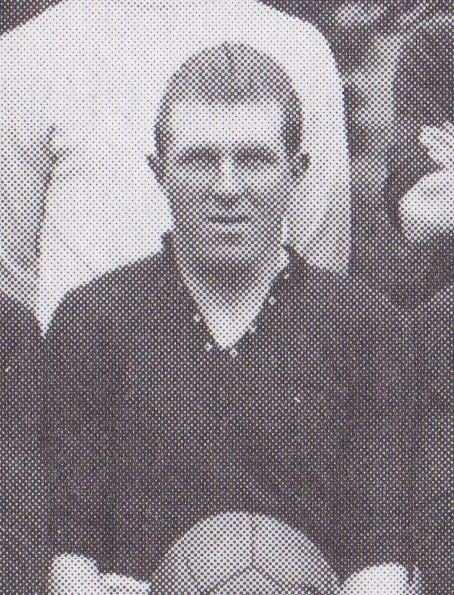
Bill Smith scored York City's first Midland League goal, in a 4–2 defeat to Notts County reserves on 6 September 1922.

York City Football Club is a professional association football club based in York, North Yorkshire, England. Formed in 1922, York played in the Midland League for seven years before being elected to the Football League ahead of the 1929–30 season. Since that time, the club's first team have competed in numerous competitions, and all players who have played between 25 and 99 such matches, either as a member of the starting eleven or as a substitute, are listed below.

Each player's details include the duration of his York career, his typical playing position while with the club, and the number of matches played and goals scored in domestic league matches and in all senior competitive matches. Where applicable, the list also includes the national team for which the player was selected, and the number of senior international caps he won.

== Introduction ==
As of the date specified below, 397 men had completed their York career after making at least 25 and fewer than 100 appearances in senior competitive matches. Four of these, Tom Lockie, Barry Lyons, Denis Smith and Neil Thompson, went on to manage the club. Lockie led the team to the quarter-final of the 1961–62 League Cup and promotion from the Fourth Division in the 1964–65 season, while Smith guided York to the 1983–84 Fourth Division championship.

Jimmy Cowie set two goalscoring records in the 1928–29 season which, as of the date above, still stand; he scored 56 goals in all competitions, and 49 league goals in as many matches in the Midland League. The first player capped at full international level while with the club was Eamon Dunphy when he appeared for the Republic of Ireland against Spain on 10 November 1965. The purchase of Adrian Randall from Burnley on 28 December 1995 represents the club's record transfer fee paid, at £140,000.

Other players took part in significant matches in the history of the club. David Archibald, Jimmy Cowie, Charlie Davis, Sam Evans, Jack Farmery and Bill Gardner appeared in York's first Football League match in 1929. Keith Houchen scored the winning goal with a penalty in a 1–0 win over First Division team Arsenal in the 1984–85 FA Cup. Four men listed here featured in the York team that won in the 2012 Conference Premier play-off final, those being Jon Challinor, Chris Doig, Jamie Reed and Jason Walker.

As of the date below, no player has left the club with 99 career appearances; four – John Stone, Barry Lyons, Gary Bull and Malcolm Comrie – finished on 98. The list includes 12 players who are still contracted to the club, and so can add to their totals.

== Key ==
- The list is ordered first by number of appearances in total, then by number of league appearances, and then if necessary by date of debut.
- Appearances as a substitute are included.
- Statistics are correct up to and including the match played on 21 November 2026. Where a player left the club permanently after this date, his statistics are updated to his date of leaving.

Player
Players marked * were registered for the club as at the date specified above.
Players with name in italics and marked † were on loan from another club for the duration of their York career. The loaning club is noted in the Notes column.
Players marked ‡ have won the York City Clubman of the Year award.

Positions key
Pre-1960s		1960s–	
GK	Goalkeeper		
FB	Full-back	DF	Defender
HB	Half-back	MF	Midfielder
FW	Forward		
U	Utility player		

Position
Playing positions are listed according to the tactical formations that were employed at the time. Thus the change in the names of defensive and midfield positions reflects the tactical evolution that occurred from the 1960s onwards.
Club career
Club career is defined as the first and last calendar years in which the player appeared for the club in any of the competitions listed below.
League appearances and league goals
League appearances and goals comprise those in the Midland League, the Football League and the Football Conference/National League. Appearances in the 1939–40 Football League season, abandoned after three matches because of the Second World War, are excluded.
Total appearances and total goals
Total appearances and goals comprise those in the Midland League, Football League (including play-offs), Football Conference/National League (including play-offs), FA Cup, Football League Third Division North Cup, Football League Cup, Associate Members' Cup/Football League Trophy/EFL Trophy, FA Trophy and Conference Cup/Conference League Cup. Matches in wartime competitions are excluded.
International selection
Countries are listed only for players who have been selected for international football. Only the highest level of international competition is given, except where a player competed for more than one country, in which case the highest level reached for each country is shown.
Caps
For players having played at full international level, the caps column counts the number of such appearances during his career with the club.

== Players with 25 to 99 appearances ==
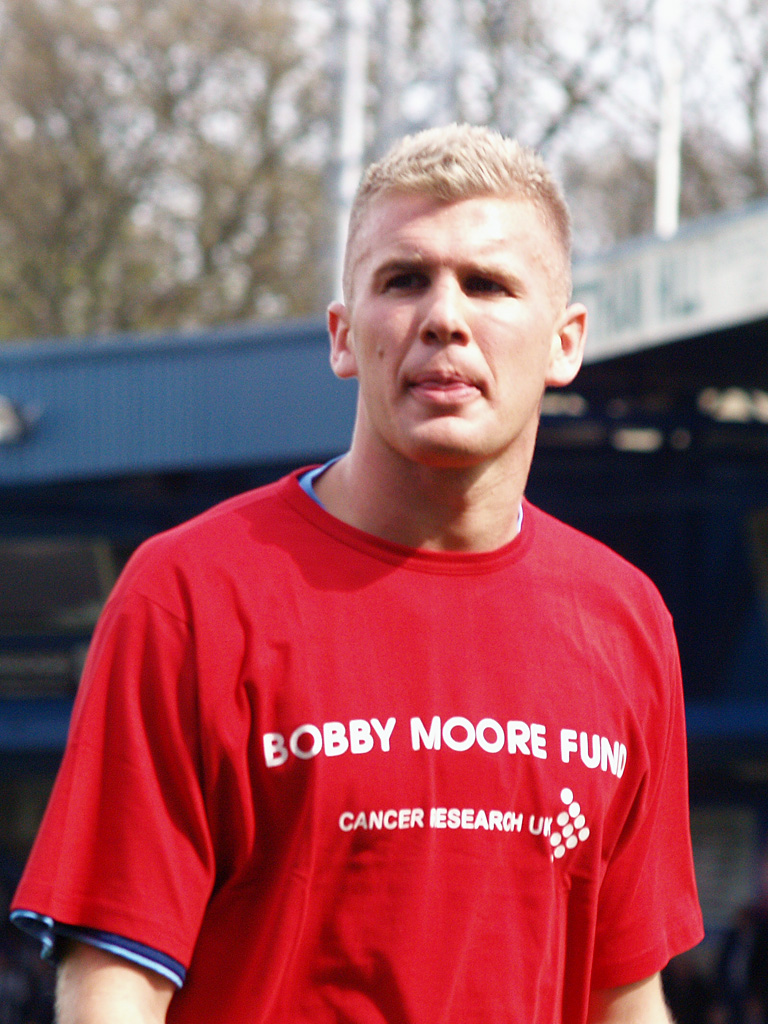
Andy Bishop was the 2005–06 Conference National top scorer, becoming the first York City player to top the divisional scoring charts since the 1954–55 season.

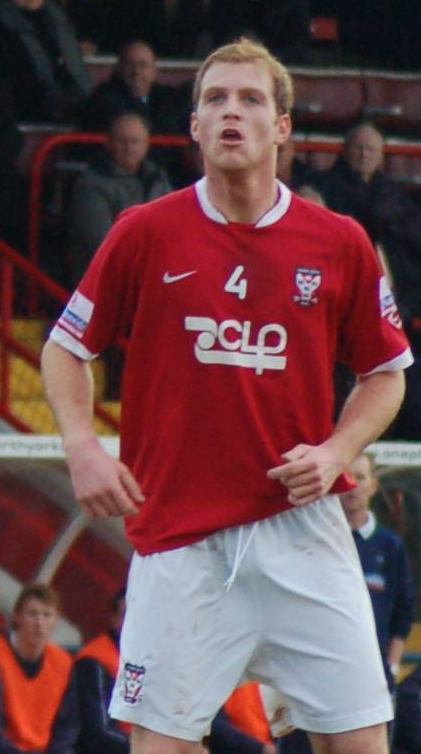
Neal Bishop was voted Clubman of the Year for the 2006–07 season, in which York reached the Conference National play-off semi-final.

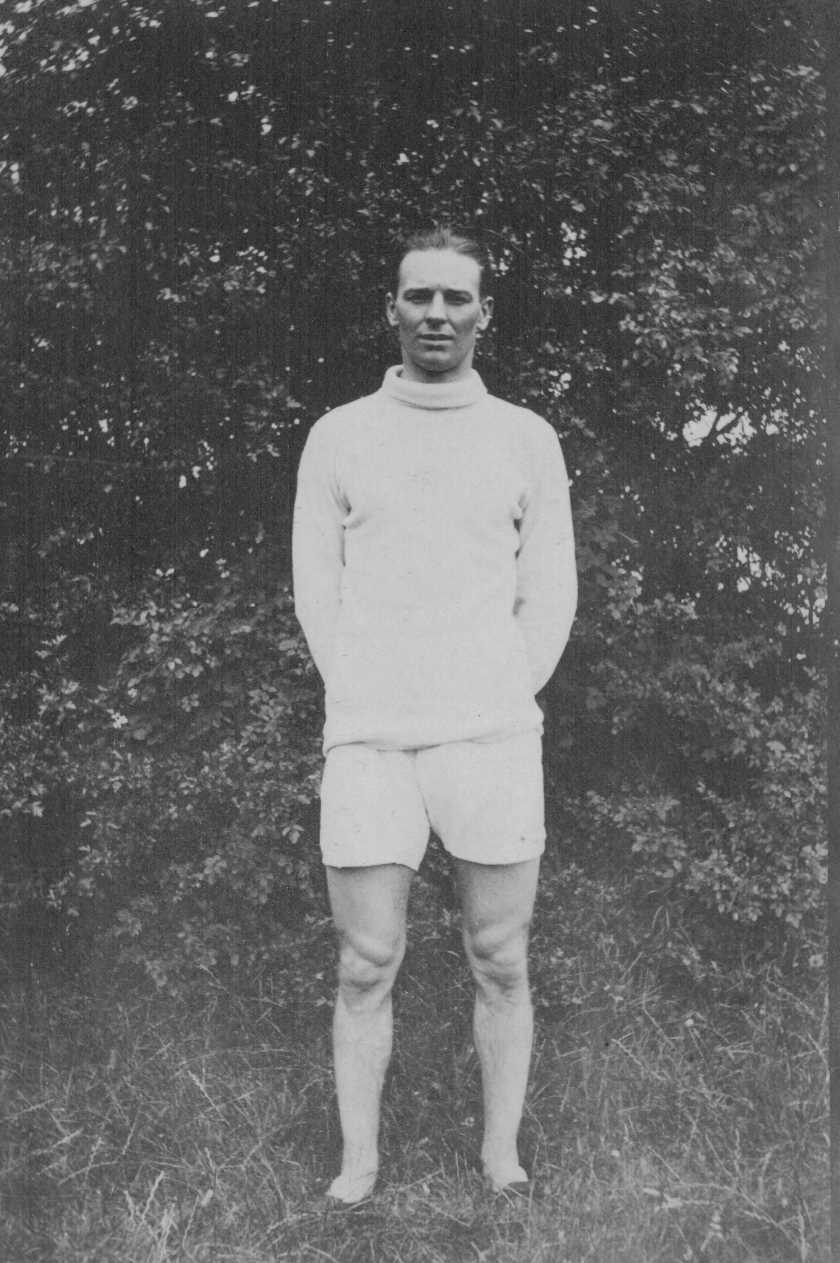
Arthur Charlesworth was York's top scorer in the 1923–24 season with 12 goals.

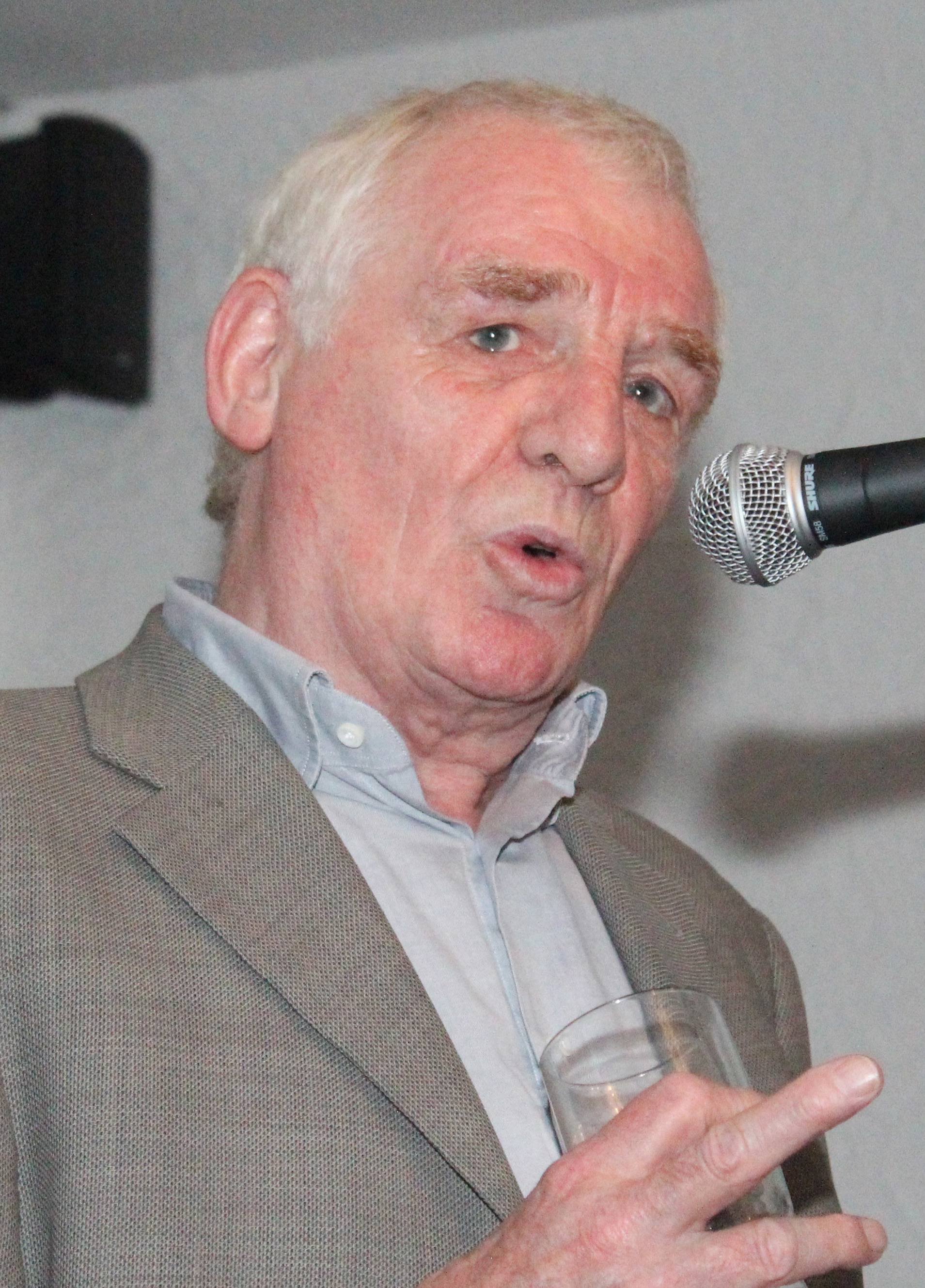
Eamon Dunphy, the first player to be capped at full international level while with York

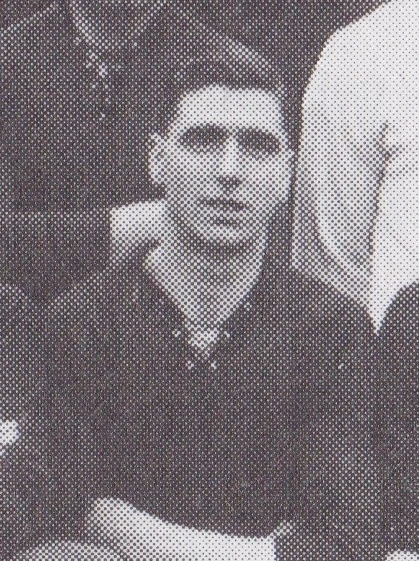
York's top scorer in their first Midland League season was Charles Elliott, with 16 goals in 1922–23.

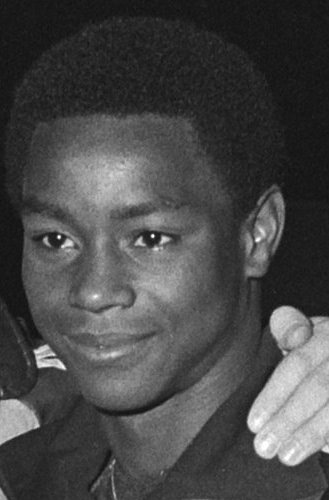
Former England B international Chris Fairclough had an injury-hit spell with York before retiring in 2001.

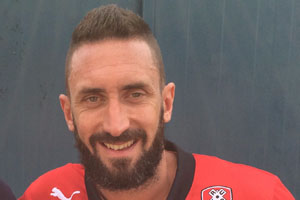
York received an initial transfer fee of £350,000 when Jonathan Greening signed for Manchester United in 1998.

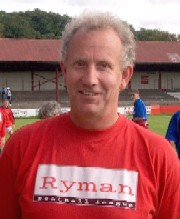
Ron Hillyard made his debut aged 17 due to poor performances from the team's senior goalkeepers.

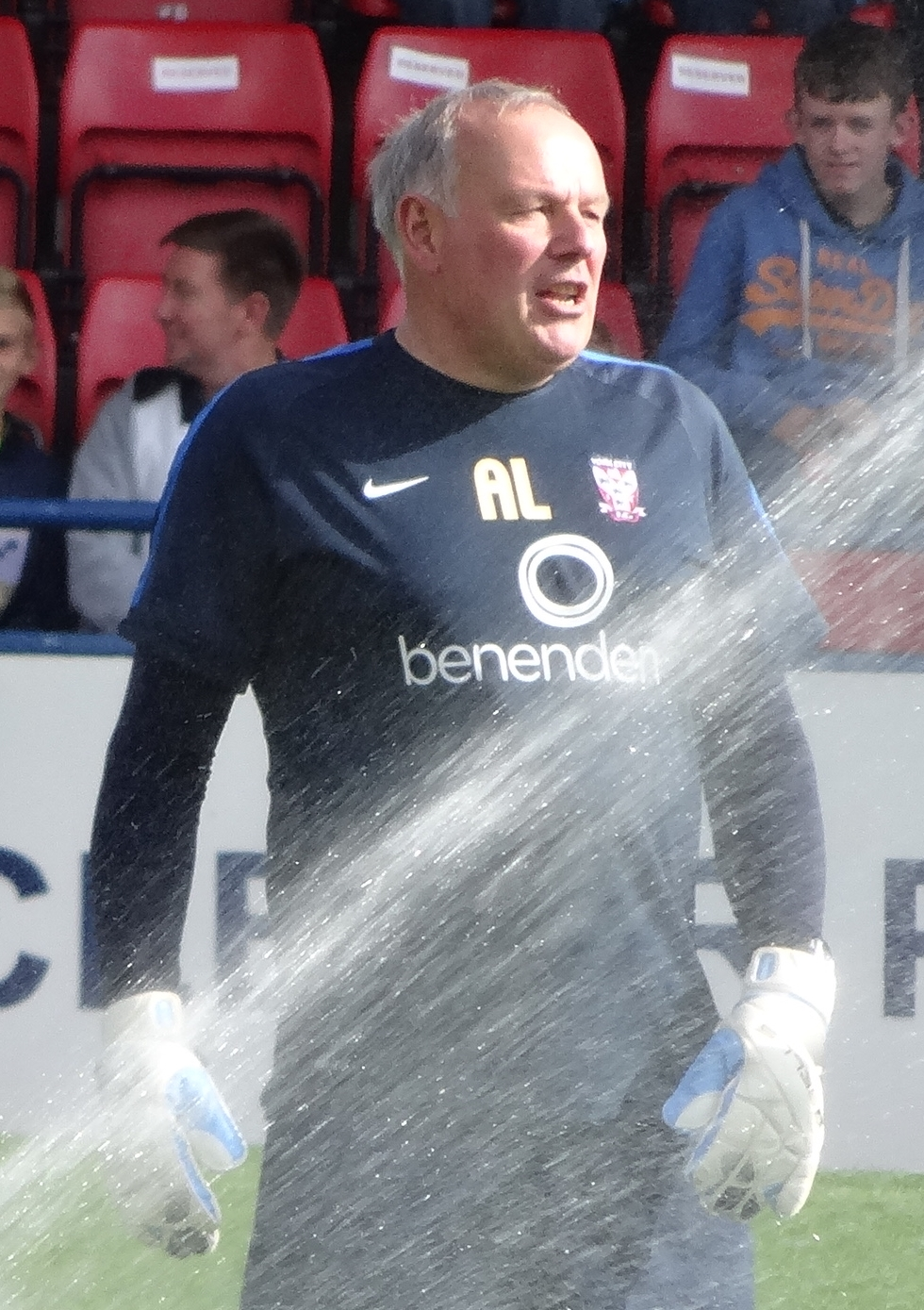
Andy Leaning was named man of the match for his goalkeeping performance in York's 3–1 extra-time defeat away to Liverpool in the 1985–86 FA Cup.

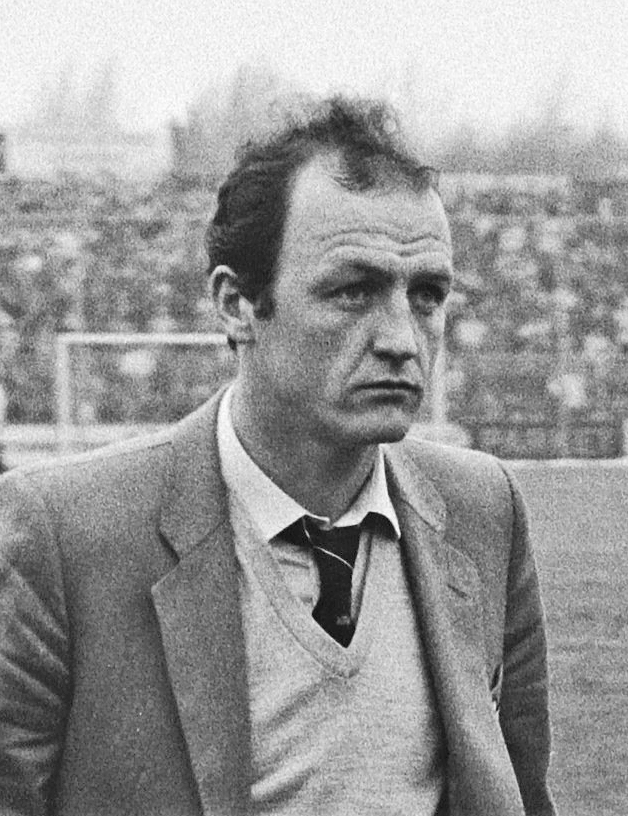
York signed David Loggie from Burnley for a then-club record transfer fee of £20,000 in 1978.

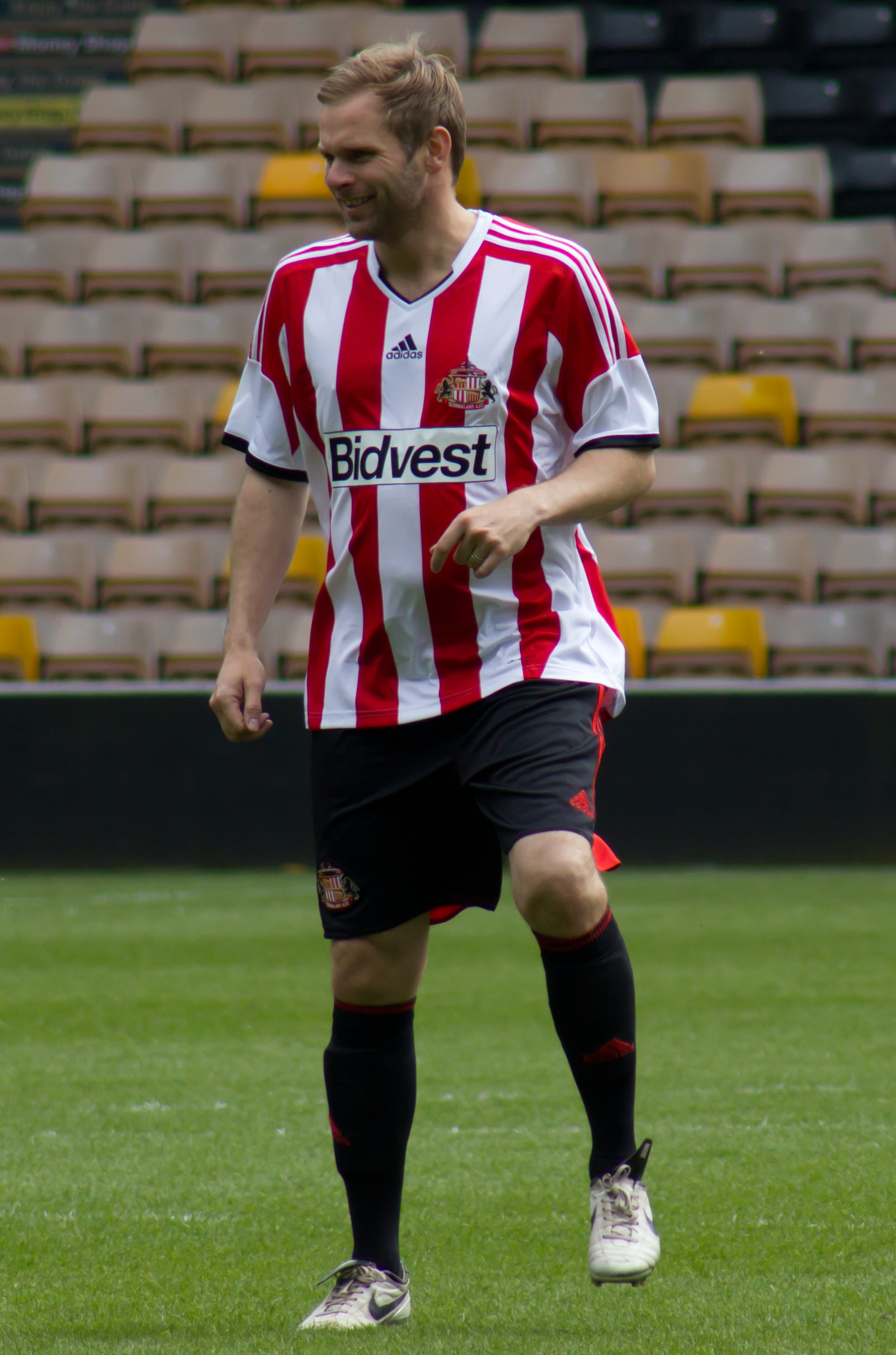
Michael Proctor, who played on loan from Sunderland, was York's top scorer in the 2001–02 season with 14 goals.

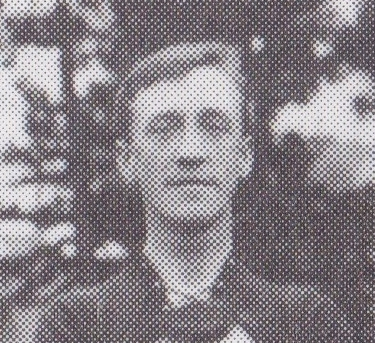
Ted Thorpe missed only one match in York's inaugural Midland League season in 1922–23.

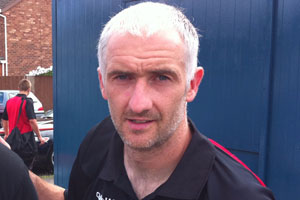
Andy Warrington made his debut in the second leg of York's 4–3 aggregate victory over Manchester United in the 1995–96 League Cup.

Table of players, including playing position, club statistics and international selection
Player	Pos	Club career	League		Total		International selection	Caps	Notes	Ref
Player	Pos	Club career	Apps	Goals	Apps	Goals	International selection	Caps	Notes	Ref
Joe Felix * ‡	DF	2024–present	87	3	98	5	—	—		
John Stone	DF	1972–1976	86	5	98	5	—	—		
Barry Lyons	MF	1973–1975	85	10	98	11	—	—	(Note: Player who also managed the club.) (Note: Nottingham Forest)	
Gary Bull	FW	1996–1998	83	11	98	13	—	—		
Malcolm Comrie	FW	1936–1938	79	20	98	24	—	—		
Ken Turner	DF	1966–1968	88	2	97	2	—	—		
Colin Addison	FW	1957–1961	87	28	97	31	—	—		
Simon Heslop	MF	2016–2019	84	9	97	10	—	—		
Tom Evans	GK	2006–2008	81	0	97	0	Northern Ireland B	—		
Paul Johnson	DF	1987–1989	83	1	96	1	—	—		
Eddie Legge	FB	1935–1938	82	2	96	2	—	—		
Jamal Fyfield	DF	2010–2013	79	4	96	4	—	—		
Jimmy Weir	MF	1960–1963	82	38	95	39	—	—		
Gary Swann	MF	1992–1994	82	4	95	6	—	—		
Mick Albrecht	FW	1922–1929	85	20	94	23	—	—		
Jack Brooks	FB	1929–1932	82	0	93	0	—	—		
Andy Flynn	FB	1926–1928	80	0	93	0	—	—		
Harrison Male	GK	2024–2026	87	0	92	0	England C	—		
Maurice Dando	FW	1933–1935	82	46	92	52	—	—		
Hamza Bencherif	DF	2017–2019	81	3	92	3	Algeria under-20	—	(Note: Wrexham)	
Alan Pearce	MF	1983–1987	78	9	92	10	—	—		
George Maskill	HB	1924–1927; 1932	85	0	91	0	England schools	—		
Bobby Sibbald	DF	1969–1971	79	7	91	8	—	—		
Ted MacDougall	FW	1967–1969	84	34	90	40	Scotland	0		
Steve Agnew	MF	1998–2001	81	4	90	5	—	—		
Charles Elliott	FW	1922–1925	81	25	89	27	—	—		
Scott Kerr ‡	MF	2011–2013	78	0	89	1	England C	—		
Iain Dunn	FW	1988–1991	77	11	89	11	—	—		
Freddie Scott	FW	1937–1946	74	16	89	21	England schools	—	(Note: Also played for York City during the Second World War.) (Note: Player statistics exclude three matches played in the aborted 1939–40 season.)	
Tony Young	MF / DF	1976–1978	78	2	88	2	—	—		
Dicky Merritt	FW	1926–1929	70	31	88	41	—	—		
Keith Houchen	FW	1984–1986	67	19	88	27	—	—		
Jimmy Rudd	FW	1947–1949	83	23	87	24	—	—		
Eddie Blackburn ‡	GK	1980–1982	76	0	87	0	—	—		
Jason Walker	FW	2011–2013	73	27	87	27	England C	—		
David Archibald	FB	1929–1933	85	0	86	0	—	—		
Fred Speed	HB	1934–1936	79	15	86	17	—	—		
Bill Routledge	HB	1934–1936	78	1	86	1	—	—		
Andy Leaning	GK	1985–1987	69	0	86	0	—	—		
Josh Carson	MF / DF	2013–2016	80	7	85	8	Northern Ireland	0	(Note: Ipswich Town)	
Andy Bishop	FW	2004–2006	78	33	85	37	England C	—		
Jamie Reed	FW	2011–2013	74	20	85	25	Wales semi-pro	—		
Jordan Burrow	FW	2018–2020	73	28	85	34	England C	—		
George Ivey	FW	1948–1951	79	13	84	14	—	—		
Gordon Hunter	DF	1973–1978	77	1	84	1	—	—		
David Pugh	MF / DF	1978–1981	77	2	84	3	Wales under-23	—		
Roly Horrey	MF	1966–1968	74	9	84	10	—	—		
Des Thompson	GK	1951–1952	80	0	83	0	—	—		
Steve Spooner	MF	1988–1990	72	11	83	15	—	—		
Mitch Hancox	MF	2021–2023	68	10	83	14	—	—	(Note: Hereford)	
Martin Butler	FW	1984–1988	65	9	83	13	—	—		
Mick Granger	GK	1952–1962	71	0	81	0	—	—		
Pat Lally	MF	1971–1973	71	5	81	5	—	—		
Mark Robinson	DF	2007–2009	68	4	81	4	England C	—		
Tommy Gale	HB	1947–1949	76	0	80	0	—	—		
Bill Smith	HB	1922–1925	75	4	80	4	—	—		
Malachi Fagan-Walcott	DF	2024–2026	75	14	80	14	England under-17	—	(Note: Cardiff City)	
John Hawksby	FW	1966–1968	74	7	80	7	England under-18	—		
David McAughtrie	DF	1985–1987	64	1	80	2	—	—		
Bob Ramsey	FB	1958–1961	75	0	79	0	—	—		
Barry Wealthall	DF	1963–1966	75	0	79	0	—	—		
Des Fawcett	GK	1932–1934	74	0	79	0	—	—		
Darren Craddock	DF	2006–2008	69	0	79	0	—	—	(Note: Hartlepool United)	
Levi Mackin	MF	2009–2011	61	2	79	2	Wales under-21	—		
Steve Griffiths	FW	1951–1953	74	12	78	12	—	—		
John Duthie	HB	1928–1929; 1930–1931	70	4	78	6	—	—		
Femi Ilesanmi	DF	2014–2016	70	0	78	0	—	—		
John Stainsby	FW	1961–1963	69	21	78	25	—	—		
Jack Farmery	GK	1929–1931	67	0	78	0	—	—		
Marco Gabbiadini	FW	1985–1987; 1998	67	15	78	19	England B	—		
Dipo Akinyemi *	FW	2023–2025; 2026–present	66	19	78	20	—	—		
Tommy McDonald	FW	1931–1935	75	11	77	12	—	—		
Christian Fox	MF	1999–2004	70	1	77	1	—	—		
Graham Brown	GK	1977–1980	69	0	77	0	—	—		
Jimmy Cowie	FW	1928–1931	67	58	77	66	—	—	(Note: Cowie holds the club record for the most goals in a season; 56 in 1928–29. His 49 goals in the Midland League that season is also a club record.)	
Matt Jenkinson	FW	1930–1932; 1933–1934	72	20	76	21	—	—		
Neil Barrett	MF	2009–2011	63	6	76	7	England schools	—		
Andy Warrington	GK	1995–1999	61	0	76	0	—	—		
Lester Marshall	HB	1924–1925; 1928–1929	67	10	75	15	—	—		
Sam Evans	FW	1929–1931	66	12	75	14	—	—		
Tommy Henderson	MF	1970–1972	64	7	75	11	—	—		
Joe Laws	FW	1924–1926	70	16	74	17	—	—		
Eddie Rowles	FW	1971–1973	67	14	74	14	—	—		
Cliff Calvert	DF / MF	1973–1975	67	0	74	0	England under-18	—		
Mark Sertori	DF	1999–2001	66	2	74	2	—	—		
Ron Hillyard	GK	1969–1974	61	0	74	0	—	—		
Sandy Acklam	HB	1922–1926	72	11	73	11	—	—		
Jimmy Hinch	FW	1974–1977	68	12	73	13	—	—		
Harry Fallon	GK	1965–1967	67	0	73	0	—	—		
Maziar Kouhyar	MF	2022–2024	66	7	73	8	Afghanistan	5		
Kallum Griffiths	DF	2018–2020	64	4	73	4	—	—		
Jon Challinor	DF / MF	2011–2013	58	2	73	3	England C	—		
Charlie Davis	HB	1929–1931	61	1	72	2	—	—		
Tommy Maskill	FW / HB / FB	1922–1923; 1932–1933	70	4	71	4	England schools	—		
Josh Stones *	FW	2025–present	66	25	71	27	England schools	—		
Terry Eccles	FW	1979–1981	64	18	71	19	—	—		
Maxim Kouogun	DF	2022–2023	61	3	71	3	Republic of Ireland under-17	—		
Mark Convery	MF	2005–2007	66	8	70	9	—	—		
Adam Bartlett	GK	2017–2019	62	0	70	0	England C	—		
Dennis Wann	MF	1972–1975	66	7	69	7	—	—		
Luke Summerfield	MF	2014–2016	65	11	69	12	—	—		
Chris Porter	GK	2004–2006	64	0	69	0	—	—		
Bobby Mimms	GK	1998–2000	63	0	68	0	England under-21	—	(Note: Rotherham United)	
Wes Fletcher	FW	2013–2015	61	16	68	20	—	—		
Alex Kempster	FW	2018–2020	61	17	68	19	—	—		
Josh Law	DF	2017–2019	59	1	68	1	—	—		
Chris Carruthers	MF / DF	2009–2011	52	3	68	4	England under-20	—	(Note: Oxford United)	
Michael Duckworth	DF	2020–2024	52	3	68	3	—	—		
Akil Wright	MF	2020–2022	51	7	68	7	—	—		
Terry Farmer	FW	1958–1960	66	28	67	28	—	—		
Geoff Hutt	DF	1977–1978	63	1	67	1	—	—		
Lev Yalcin	MF / FW	2002–2006	62	2	67	2	Turkey under-19	—		
Tommy Ross	FW	1967–1969	61	20	67	23	—	—		
Mike Walker	GK	1966–1968	60	0	67	0	Wales under-23	—		
Leigh Wood	MF	2001–2004	64	0	66	0	—	—		
Darren Bradshaw	MF / DF	1987–1989	59	3	66	3	England under-18	—		
Mark Kitching *	DF	2015; 2025–present	61	2	65	3	—	—	(Note: Middlesbrough)	
Willie Millar	FW	1929–1931	58	12	65	12	—	—		
Sam Earl	FW	1937–1939	58	9	65	10	—	—		
Joe Ashworth	HB	1963–1965	57	0	65	0	—	—		
Tommy Spencer	FW	1966–1968	57	21	65	26	—	—		
Vadaine Oliver	FW	2015–2017	55	14	65	20	—	—		
Joe Harris	HB	1931–1933	62	0	64	0	Scotland	0		
Tony Moor	GK	1962–1964	57	0	64	0	—	—		
Joe Neenan	GK	1977–1980	56	0	64	0	—	—		
Adam Crookes	DF	2022–2025	56	6	64	6	—	—		
Michael Gash	FW	2009–2010	53	8	64	8	England C	—		
Harry Searson	GK	1952–1954	62	0	63	0	—	—		
Ernie Wardle	FB	1955–1959	60	2	63	2	—	—		
Neal Bishop ‡	MF	2006–2007	59	4	63	4	England C	—		
Arthur Clayton	HB	1925–1929	57	16	63	22	—	—		
Gary Hobson	DF	2000–2003	55	0	63	0	—	—		
Joe Tait	DF	2018–2020	54	3	63	4	—	—		
Alex Lawless	MF	2009–2010	51	4	63	4	Wales semi-pro	—		
Tyrese Sinclair	MF	2024–2025	57	7	62	9	—	—		
Joe Grey *	FW	2025–present	57	7	62	7	—	—		
Laurie Calloway	MF	1971–1972	55	3	61	5	—	—		
John McCombe	DF	2014–2015	55	4	61	4	—	—		
Simon Rusk	MF	2008–2009	51	0	61	1	—	—		
Paul Baker	FW	1994–1996	48	18	61	21	—	—		
Harry Brigham	FB	1948–1950	56	5	60	6	—	—		
Alex Newby *	FW	2025–present	54	18	60	20	—	—		
Derek Craig	DF	1980–1982	53	1	60	1	—	—		
Alex Mathie	FW	2000–2003	52	3	60	4	—	—		
Macaulay Langstaff	FW	2018–2020	52	11	60	11	—	—		
Matty Brown	DF	2020–2022	47	2	60	3	—	—		
Ollie Banks *	MF	2025–present	54	8	59	8	—	—		
Ken Boyes	DF	1957–1966	53	2	59	2	—	—		
Colin Alcide	FW	1999–2001	53	7	59	8	—	—		
Mike Astbury	GK	1980–1985	48	0	59	0	—	—		
Jonathan Smith	MF	2010–2011; 2012	51	4	58	5	—	—		
Phil Wilson	MF	1987–1989	46	2	58	3	—	—		
Anthony Lloyd	DF	2006–2008	45	0	58	1	—	—		
George Patterson	HB	1957–1960	57	4	57	4	—	—		
George Sayles	FB	1924–1925	52	0	57	0	—	—		
Scott Flinders	GK	2015–2016	52	0	57	0	England under-20	—		
Bill Gardner	FW	1929–1931	51	26	57	28	England amateur	—		
Kurt Willoughby	FW	2020; 2021–2022	45	10	57	14	England C	—	(Note: AFC Fylde)	
Nick Hendry	GK	1922–1924	56	0	56	0	—	—		
Matt Middleton	GK	1949–1950	55	0	56	0	—	—		
Jim Cairney	HB	1956–1958	53	0	56	0	—	—		
Charlie Twissell	FW	1958–1961	53	8	56	8	Great Britain; England amateur	—		
David Loggie	FW	1978–1980	50	11	56	11	—	—		
Jake Hyde	FW	2014–2016	50	9	56	10	England C	—		
Aidan Connolly	MF	2016–2018	50	9	56	11	Scotland under-19	—		
David Robertson	GK	1928–1929	49	0	56	0	—	—		
Derrick Downing	DF / MF	1975–1977	47	2	56	2	—	—		
Amari Morgan-Smith	FW	2017–2018	46	8	56	11	England C	—	(Note: Cheltenham Town)	
Joe Harron	FW	1922–1923; 1925–1926	51	8	55	8	—	—		
Bryan Stewart	MF	2003–2006	49	3	55	3	—	—		
Sam Charnley	HB	1928–1929	48	4	55	5	—	—		
Barry Wellings	FW	1978–1980	47	9	55	11	—	—		
Barry Conlon	FW	1999–2000	48	11	54	11	Republic of Ireland under-21	—		
Lewis Montrose	MF	2013–2015	47	1	54	1	—	—		
Marvin McCoy	DF	2014–2015	45	0	54	0	Antigua and Barbuda	1		
David Daniels	FB	1926–1928	50	0	53	0	—	—		
Alec Jackson	HB / FW	1946–1950	50	5	53	5	—	—		
Ian Butler	MF	1973–1975	46	2	53	3	England under-18	—		
Martin Reed	DF	1997–2000	46	0	53	0	—	—		
Daniel McBreen	FW	2007; 2008–2009	43	7	53	12	—	—	(Note: Scunthorpe United)	
Alan Whitehead	DF	1986–1988	41	1	53	2	—	—		
Hiram Boateng *	MF	2025–present	49	3	52	3	—	—		
Tom Platt	MF	2013–2015	47	0	52	0	—	—		
Martin Garratt	MF	1998–1999	45	1	52	1	—	—		
Scott Burgess	MF	2019; 2022–2024	45	2	52	2	—	—	(Note: Bury)	
Gordon Morritt	GK	1969–1971	41	0	52	0	—	—		
Dan Kelly	FW	1930–1932	48	12	51	12	—	—		
Nathan Peat	DF	2005–2007	48	2	51	2	—	—		
Dave Winfield ‡	DF	2014–2016	47	4	51	4	—	—		
Adam Smith	MF	2008–2010	44	4	51	4	—	—	(Note: Gainsborough Trinity)	
Jim Branagan	DF	1987–1988	42	1	51	1	—	—		
Peter Pickering	GK	1947–1948	49	0	50	0	—	—		
Johnny Edgar	FW	1959–1961	47	16	50	18	—	—		
Marvin Armstrong	MF	2024–2025	46	5	50	5	—	—		
Ashley Nathaniel-George	MF	2024–2026	46	6	50	6	Antigua and Barbuda	0		
Dennis Hoggart	FW	1960–1964	45	11	50	11	—	—		
Peter Duffield	FW	2000–2003	45	19	50	21	—	—		
Eric McMordie	MF	1975–1976	42	2	50	2	Northern Ireland	0		
Claude Barrett	FB	1937–1938	41	0	50	0	—	—		
Paddy Atkinson	DF	1995–1998	41	0	50	0	—	—		
Scott Barrow	DF	2020–2022	40	1	50	1	Wales semi-pro	—		
George Forrest	FW	1928–1929	44	7	49	8	Canada	0		
Derek Weddle	MF	1964–1966	44	13	49	14	—	—		
Stephen Brackstone	MF	2002–2004	44	4	49	4	England under-18	—		
Billy McGhie	MF	1979–1981	43	1	49	1	Scotland under-18	—		
Ryan Jarvis	FW	2013–2014	43	8	49	9	England under-19	—		
Tony Clegg	DF	1987–1988	41	3	49	3	—	—		
Michael Proctor †	FW	2001–2002	41	14	49	14	—	—	(Note: Sunderland)	
Jack Frost	GK	1948–1951	45	0	48	0	—	—		
Richard Dawson	DF	1981–1982	45	0	48	0	—	—		
Joey Cunningham	GK	1934–1935	42	0	48	0	—	—		
George Hope	FW	1976–1978	42	8	48	8	—	—	(Note: Charlton Athletic)	
Tommy Brown	FB	1928–1929	41	0	48	0	—	—		
David McNiven	FW	2000–2001	41	8	48	10	England C	—		
Ralph Ridley	GK	1930–1932	46	0	47	0	—	—		
James Dudgeon	DF	2005–2007	44	6	47	6	Scotland under-20	—		
Ben Davies †	DF	2013–2014	44	0	47	0	—	—	(Note: Preston North End)	
Campbell McMurray	FB	1923–1924	42	0	47	0	—	—		
Steve Bowey	MF	2006–2007	42	7	47	8	—	—		
Oliver Levick	HB	1927–1928	41	1	47	2	—	—		
Joe Roberts	FW	1928–1929	40	6	47	7	—	—		
Fred Glover	FB	1924–1926	45	0	46	0	—	—		
John Williams	FW	1999–2000	42	3	46	3	—	—		
Paul Groves	MF	2004–2005	42	3	46	3	—	—		
Kevin Dixon	FW	1988–1990	38	8	46	10	—	—		
Steve Cooper	FW	1993–1994	38	7	46	8	—	—		
Kevin Hulme	MF	1999–2001	38	7	46	7	—	—		
Stuart Elliott	MF	2007–2008	36	3	46	3	—	—		
Mark Greaves	MF / DF	2008–2009	35	3	46	4	—	—		
Andre Boucaud	MF	2010–2012	43	1	45	1	Trinidad and Tobago	0	(Note: Kettering Town)	
Jeff King *	DF	2024–present	42	0	45	0	—	—		
Peter Till	MF	2010–2011	41	4	45	4	—	—		
Dan Pybus	MF	2022–2023	41	0	45	0	England C	—		
George Waite	FW	1927–1928	39	8	45	9	—	—		
Billy Bottrill	FW	1929–1930	39	18	45	20	—	—		
Darren Kelly	DF	2007–2009	36	2	45	2	Northern Ireland under-21	—		
Harry Green	FW	1935–1936	42	8	44	8	—	—		
Neil Thompson	DF	1998–2000	42	8	44	9	England C	—	(Note: Barnsley)	
J. Smith	GK	1924–1925	41	0	44	0	—	—		
Peter Oliver	DF	1974–1975	41	0	44	0	Scotland under-23	—		
Mark Ovendale	GK	2003–2004	41	0	44	0	—	—		
Nick Richardson	MF	2001–2002	39	1	44	2	—	—		
George Crowther	GK	1927–1928	38	0	44	0	—	—		
George Thompson	GK	1926–1927	37	0	44	0	—	—		
Ron Greensmith	FW	1958–1959	42	1	43	1	—	—		
Micky Laverick	MF	1982–1983	41	6	43	6	—	—		
John Sharples	DF	1996–1997	38	1	43	1	—	—		
Jack Eyres	FW	1934–1935	37	13	43	13	—	—		
Denis Smith	DF	1982–1983	37	5	43	5	—	—	(Note: Stoke City)	
Ryan Bowman	FW	2013–2014	37	8	43	8	—	—		
Scott Endersby	GK	1987–1989	35	0	43	0	England under-18	—		
Tom Kelly	DF	1989–1990	35	2	43	3	—	—		
Don Wood	FB	1923–1925	41	0	42	0	—	—		
Stan Wilcockson	HB	1933–1934	39	5	42	6	—	—		
Billy Chadwick	FW	2024–2025	39	4	42	4	—	—		
Tom Davison	FW	1923–1924	37	2	42	3	—	—		
Mike Basham	DF	2001–2002	36	3	42	3	England under-18	—		
Djoumin Sangaré	DF / MF	2009–2010	32	3	42	4	—	—		
Adam Boyes	FW	2008–2009	29	2	42	3	England C	—		
Ted Thorpe	FB	1922–1923	41	0	41	0	—	—		
Walter Porritt	FW	1936–1947	40	5	41	5	—	—		
George Wilson	GK	1935–1936	39	0	41	0	—	—		
James Miller	FW	1924–1925	38	17	41	20	—	—		
Alex Hurst	MF	2022–2023	38	2	41	2	—	—		
Zak Johnson *	DF	2025–present	38	2	41	2	England under-18	—		
Noel Peyton	FW	1963–1965	37	4	41	5	Republic of Ireland	0		
Chris Fairclough	DF	1999–2000	37	0	41	0	England B	—	(Note: Notts County)	
Charlie Lemons	FW	1922–1923	40	5	40	5	—	—		
Clive Colbridge	FW	1955–1957	37	14	40	15	—	—		
Mark Bower †	DF	2000–2001	36	2	40	2	—	—	(Note: Bradford City)	
James Berrett	MF	2015–2016	36	4	40	5	Republic of Ireland under-21	—		
Wes York	MF	2018–2020	36	3	40	4	—	—		
Nicky Wroe	MF	2007–2008	29	6	40	10	England C	—		
George Lee	FW	1937–1946	37	11	39	12	—	—		
Joe O'Neill	FW	2005–2006	37	5	39	5	—	—		
Richard Hope	DF	2003–2004	36	2	39	2	—	—		
Malcolm Smith	FW	1980–1981	35	6	39	6	—	—		
Ben Brookes *	DF	2025–present	35	2	39	2	—	—		
James O'Cain	FW	1924–1927	34	17	39	17	—	—		
John Borthwick	FW	1992–1993	33	8	39	8	—	—		
Stuart McKenzie	DF	1986–1988	32	0	39	0	—	—		
Les Porter	HB	1949–1953	38	1	38	1	—	—		
Peter Stronach	MF	1978–1979	34	2	38	2	England schools	—		
Arthur Charlesworth	FW	1923–1924	33	14	38	14	—	—		
Pip Rippon	FW	1923–1924	33	6	38	8	—	—		
Mick Pickering	DF	1986–1987	32	1	38	1	—	—		
Adrian Randall	MF	1996	32	2	38	2	England under-18	—	(Note: Randall holds the club record for the highest transfer fee paid by the club; £140,000, which was paid to Burnley on 28 December 1995.)	
Shaun Rooney	DF	2016–2017	30	1	38	1	—	—		
Sam Sanders	DF	2022–2023	30	3	38	3	—	—		
Jack Duthoit	FB	1946–1949	36	0	37	0	—	—		
Jock Scott	HB	1933–1934	34	1	37	1	—	—		
Paul Robinson	FW	2004–2005	34	2	37	2	—	—		
Kieran Green	MF	2019–2020	34	4	37	4	—	—		
Graham Carr	HB	1968–1969	33	1	37	1	England under-18	—		
Ryan Whitley	GK	2019–2023	32	0	37	0	—	—		
Nicky Peverell	FW	1995–1996	29	2	37	4	—	—		
Michael Woods	MF	2020–2022	29	8	37	10	England under-19	—		
Fred Walker	FW / HB	1924–1925	36	8	36	8	—	—		
Stephen Spargo	HB	1932–1933	35	0	36	0	—	—		
Bob Mortimer	FW	1938–1939	35	22	36	22	—	—		
Les Collinson	HB	1967–1968	35	2	36	2	—	—		
Graeme Law	DF	2004–2005	35	0	36	0	Scotland under-19	—		
Brian Kelly	DF	1968–1969	33	0	36	0	—	—		
Manny Duku	FW	2022–2023	30	4	36	7	—	—		
Johnny Goodchild	FW	1966–1967	29	6	36	6	—	—		
Kyle Letheren	GK	2016–2017	28	0	36	0	Wales under-21	—		
Luke Graham	DF	2009–2010	25	1	36	1	Wales under-19 Republic of Ireland under-18	—	(Note: Mansfield Town)	
Bert Brown	FW	1924–1926	35	6	35	6	—	—		
George Hamstead	MF	1964–1966	35	1	35	1	—	—		
Jake Wright	FW	2016; 2018–2019	34	5	35	6	—	—	(Note: Sheffield United)	
Stuart Wise	DF	2002–2004	33	1	35	1	—	—		
Cameron John	DF	2024–2025	32	2	35	2	—	—		
Percy Reed	HB	1923–1924	30	0	35	0	—	—		
George Bowater	FW	1934–1935	30	11	35	13	—	—		
Alex Woodyard	MF	2023–2024	29	0	35	0	England C	—		
David Stockdale	GK	2003–2005; 2023	28	0	35	0	England C	—		
Ian Winters	FW	1946–1947	27	10	35	14	—	—		
Cliff Rodgers	FB	1945–1947	26	0	35	0	—	—		
Bob Ferguson	GK	1946–1947	26	0	35	0	—	—		
Marc Lloyd Williams	FW	1999–2000	33	9	34	9	Wales B	—		
Tom Cowan	DF	2002–2003	33	1	34	1	—	—		
George Ivory	FW	1933–1934	31	9	34	9	—	—		
Ethan Ross †	GK	2022–2023	31	0	34	0	—	—	(Note: Stockport County)	
Bob Widdowson	GK	1968–1969	30	0	34	0	—	—		
Ricky Aguiar	MF	2024–2025	30	2	34	3	—	—		
Mark Samways	GK	1997–1998	29	0	34	0	—	—		
Edmund Harvey	FW	1926–1927	28	2	34	4	—	—		
Evan Jenkins	FW	1934–1935	28	10	34	12	—	—		
Gordon Connelly	MF	1998–1999	28	4	34	4	Scotland under-18	—		
Andy McWilliams	DF / MF	2008–2009	24	0	34	0	—	—		
Walter Lynch	HB	1922–1923	33	1	33	1	—	—		
Kevan Smith	DF	1988–1989	31	5	33	5	—	—		
Mitch Ward	MF	2003–2004	31	0	33	0	—	—		
Kevin Donovan	MF	2004–2005	31	2	33	2	—	—		
Mick Mahon	MF	1969–1970	29	10	33	11	England amateur	—		
Ricky Greenough	DF	1988–1990	29	1	33	1	—	—		
Howard Johnson	HB	1957–1958	28	0	33	0	—	—		
Albert Johanneson	MF	1970–1971	26	3	33	5	—	—		
Simon Russell	MF	2008–2009	24	0	33	1	—	—		
Jack Woods	FW	1922–1923	32	13	32	13	—	—		
Cam Burgess	FW	1953–1954	32	14	32	14	—	—		
Tom Lockie	HB	1933–1934	29	1	32	1	—	—		
Peter Lorimer	FW	1979–1980	29	8	32	9	Scotland	0		
Walter Lax	FW	1933–1934	28	5	32	7	—	—		
Andy Dawson	MF	1998–2000	28	1	32	1	—	—		
Lindon Meikle	MF	2014–2015	28	0	32	0	England C	—		
Levi Redfern	HB	1926–1927	27	1	32	1	—	—		
Fred Laycock	FW	1930–1931	27	12	32	16	—	—		
Yan Klukowski	MF	2016–2017	25	3	32	3	England schools	—		
Gary Nicholson	MF	1984–1985	24	4	32	4	—	—		
Albert Banfield	FW	1935–1936	30	10	31	10	—	—		
Albert Furnell	GK	1925–1928	27	0	31	0	—	—		
Will Smith †	DF	2023–2024	27	1	31	1	—	—	(Note: Harrogate Town)	
Bobby Hosker	MF	1975–1977	25	1	31	2	—	—		
Phil Crosby	DF	1991–1992	25	0	31	0	England under-20	—		
Albert Thompson	FW	1936–1937	24	24	31	29	—	—		
Chris Doig	DF	2012	24	0	31	0	Scotland under-21	—		
Tommy Spratt	HB	1968–1969	29	1	30	2	England under-18	—		
Digger Dawson	FB	1933–1934	28	1	30	1	—	—		
Jonathan Greening	MF	1997–1998; 2015	28	2	30	2	England under-21	—		
Danny Galbraith	MF	2015–2016	28	2	30	2	Scotland under-17	—		
Stéphane Zubar †	DF	2014–2015	27	2	30	2	Guadeloupe	0	(Note: AFC Bournemouth)	
Harold Cleasby	FW	1924–1925	25	5	30	9	—	—		
Bob Colville	FW	1989–1990	24	0	30	2	Wales semi-pro	—		
Billy Hill	FW	1956–1960	29	3	29	3	—	—		
Joe Hulme	FW	1923–1924	28	3	29	3	England	0		
Richie Taylor	MF	1972–1973	28	2	29	2	—	—		
Scott Jones	DF	2002–2003	28	1	29	1	—	—		
Leon Constantine	FW	2010–2011	26	8	29	8	—	—		
Steve McNulty	DF	2019–2020	26	0	29	0	—	—		
George Sykes-Kenworthy *	GK	2023–present	25	0	29	0	—	—		
Greg Olley	MF	2025–2026	25	4	29	4	England C	—		
Scott Fenwick	FW	2016–2017	24	2	29	3	—	—		
Andy Bond	MF	2019–2020	24	2	29	2	—	—		
Andy Ferrell	MF	2009–2010	22	1	29	2	—	—		
Darren Williams	MF	1994–1996	20	0	29	1	England B	—		
Raymond Noble	FW	1926–1928	28	6	28	6	—	—		
John Powell	FW	1956–1960	27	5	28	5	—	—		
Tom Brewis	FW	1930–1932	26	11	28	12	—	—		
Alf Agar	FW	1936–1937	24	4	28	7	—	—		
Bill Richardson	DF	1968–1969	24	0	28	0	—	—		
Alex Harris	MF	2018–2019	22	1	28	2	Scotland under-19	—		
Tyler Cordner	DF	2023–2024	22	2	28	3	England C	—		
Adam Reed	MF	2013; 2014	25	2	27	2	Philippines	0		
Sean Davies	DF	2003–2005	24	0	27	0	—	—		
Fraser Kerr	DF	2022–2023	24	1	27	2	Scotland under-21	—		
Michael Potts	MF	2011–2013	23	3	27	3	—	—		
Anthony Straker	MF	2014–2015	23	0	27	0	Grenada; England under-18	2		
Danny Holmes	DF	2016–2017	21	1	27	1	—	—		
George Sharpe	FW	1928–1931	25	2	26	3	—	—		
Duncan Lindsay	FW	1935–1936	25	8	26	9	—	—		
Peter Popely	DF	1963–1966	25	0	26	0	—	—		
Emile Sinclair	FW	2015	24	2	26	2	—	—		
John Bentham	MF	1981–1982	23	0	26	0	—	—		
Gilbert Shaw	FB	1923–1924	22	0	26	0	—	—		
Eamon Dunphy	MF	1965–1966	22	3	26	4	Republic of Ireland	1	(Note: Dunphy was the first player capped at full international level while at the club.)	
Marc Thompson	DF	2000–2001	22	0	26	0	—	—		
Len Butt	FW	1947	25	2	25	2	—	—		
Jan Novacki †	MF	1977–1978	25	3	25	3	England under-18	—	(Note: Bolton Wanderers)	
Bob Greener	HB / FW	1932–1933	24	0	25	0	—	—		
Jimmy Kelly	FB	1938–1939	24	0	25	0	—	—		
Paul Wilson	DF	1994–1995	22	0	25	0	—	—	(Note: Burnley)	
Paul Brayson	FW	2007–2008	22	4	25	4	England C	—		
Joe Baines	FB	1924–1926	21	3	25	3	—	—		
Ben Wilkinson	MF	2008–2009	21	2	25	2	—	—		
Kaine Felix	MF	2016–2017	21	1	25	1	—	—		
Neville Stamp	DF	2000–2002	20	0	25	0	—	—		
George Page	FB	1927–1928	19	0	25	0	—	—		
Mark Beck †	FW	2021	18	3	25	6	Scotland under-19	—		

== Notes ==
Player statistics include matches played while on loan from:
