= List of people from York =

People associated with the city of York, England

This is a list of notable people with a Wikipedia page associated with York, a city in North Yorkshire, England.

== Actors and performers ==
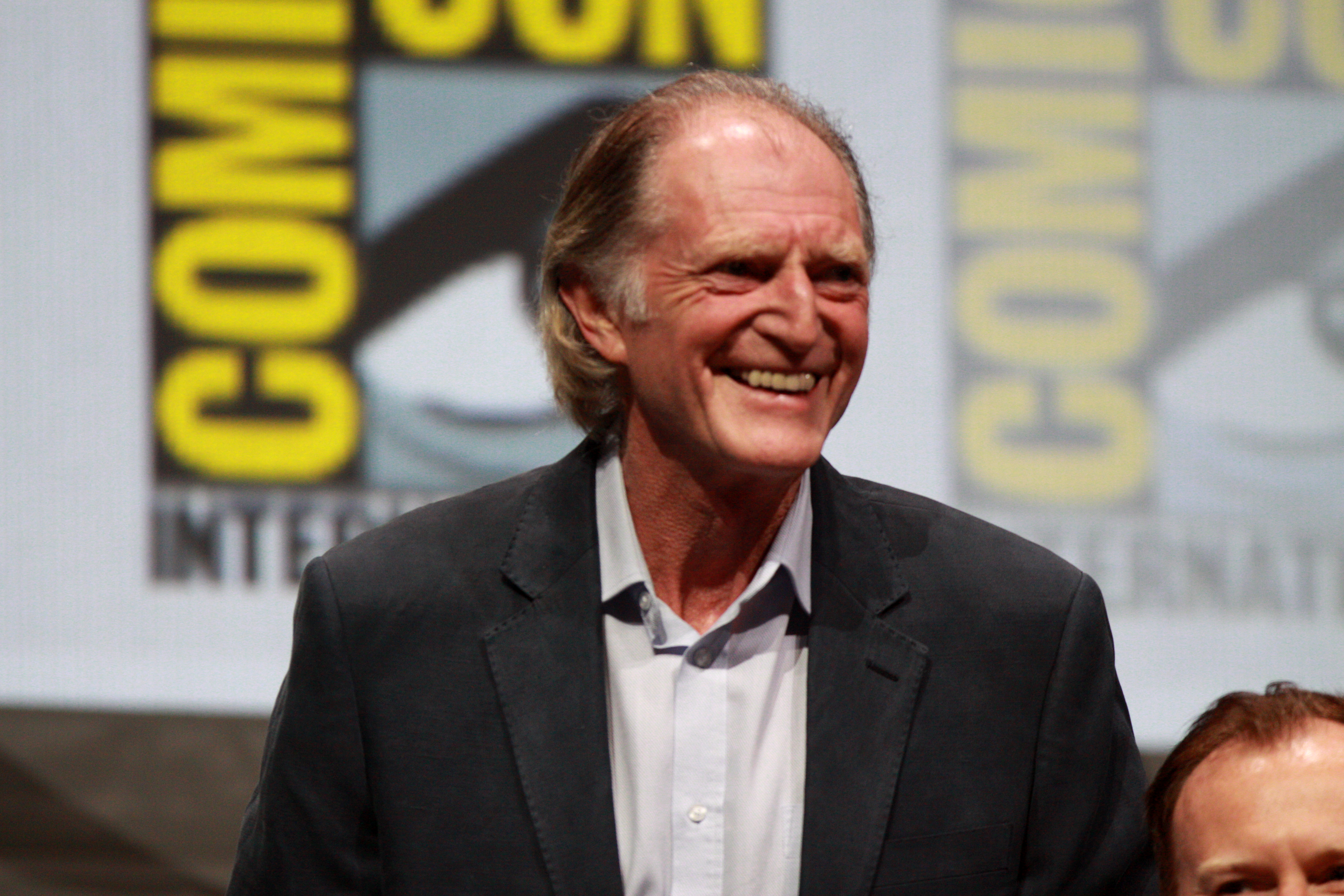
David Bradley

- Mark Addy (born 1964)
- Taj Atwal (born 1987)
- Rob Auton (living)
- David Bradley (born 1942)
- Michael Burns (born 1952)
- Judi Dench (born 1934)
- Keith Drinkel (born 1944)
- Dustin Gee (1942–1986)
- Frankie Howerd (1917–1992)
- Ian Kelsey (born 1966)
- Janet McTeer (born 1961)
- Eille Norwood (1861–1948)
- Peter Woodthorpe (1931–2004).

== Arts ==
- Mary Ellen Best (1809–1891), painter
- Nathan Drake (1728–1778), artist, a fellow of the Society of Artists
- William Etty (1787–1849), painter.
- John Flaxman (1755–1826), sculptor and draughtsman.
- Patrick Hall (1906–1992), artist
- Albert Joseph Moore (1841–1893), painter.
- Francis Place (1647–1728), artist
- Henry Scott Tuke (1858–1929), painter.

== Confectioners ==
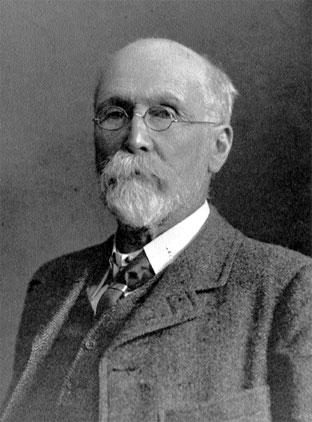
Joseph Rowntree

- Benjamin Seebohm Rowntree (1871–1954), chocolatier and reformer
- Joseph Rowntree (1836–1925), chocolatier and philanthropist
- Joseph Terry (1828–1898), confectioner.

== Musicians ==
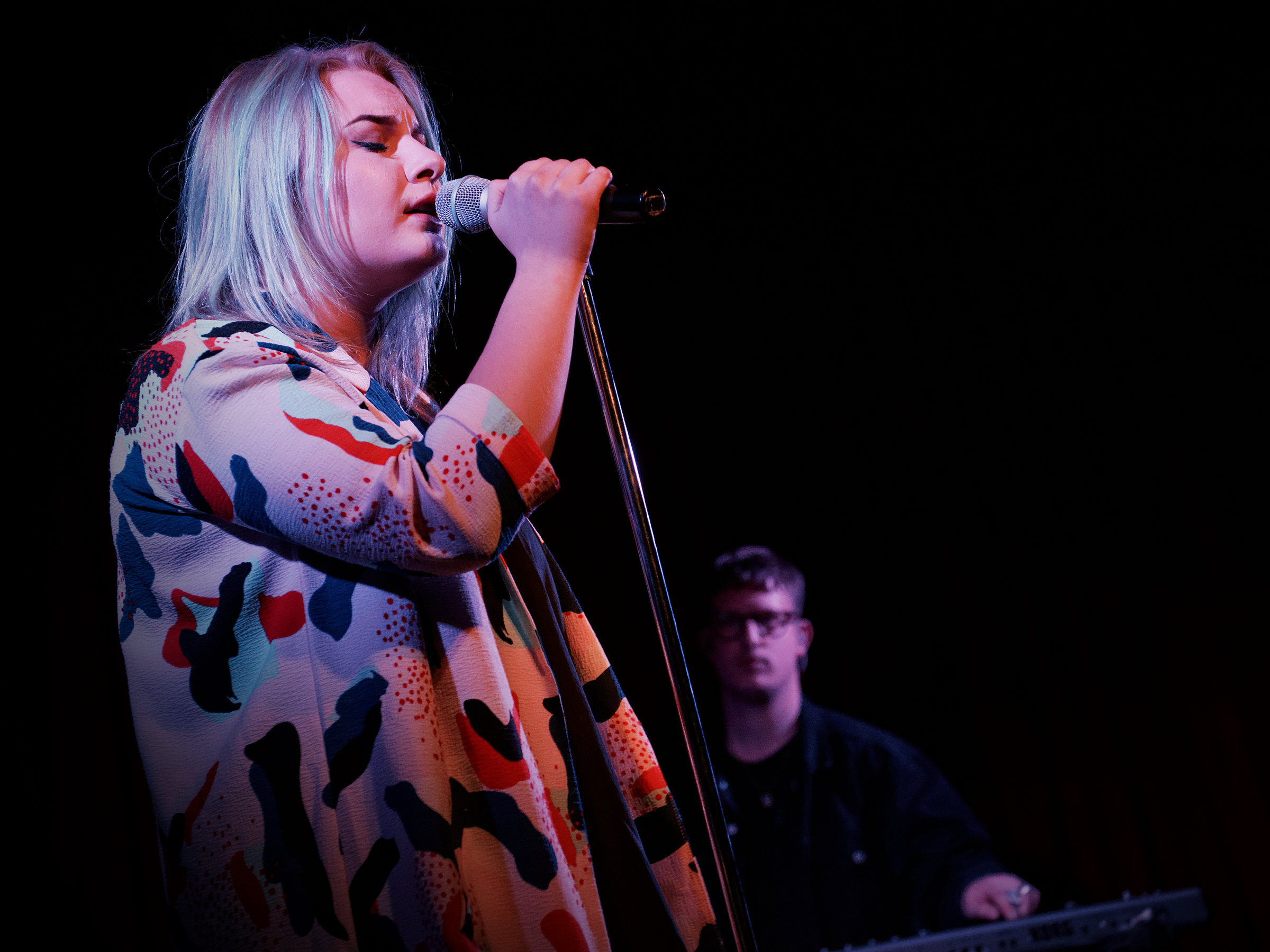
Låpsley

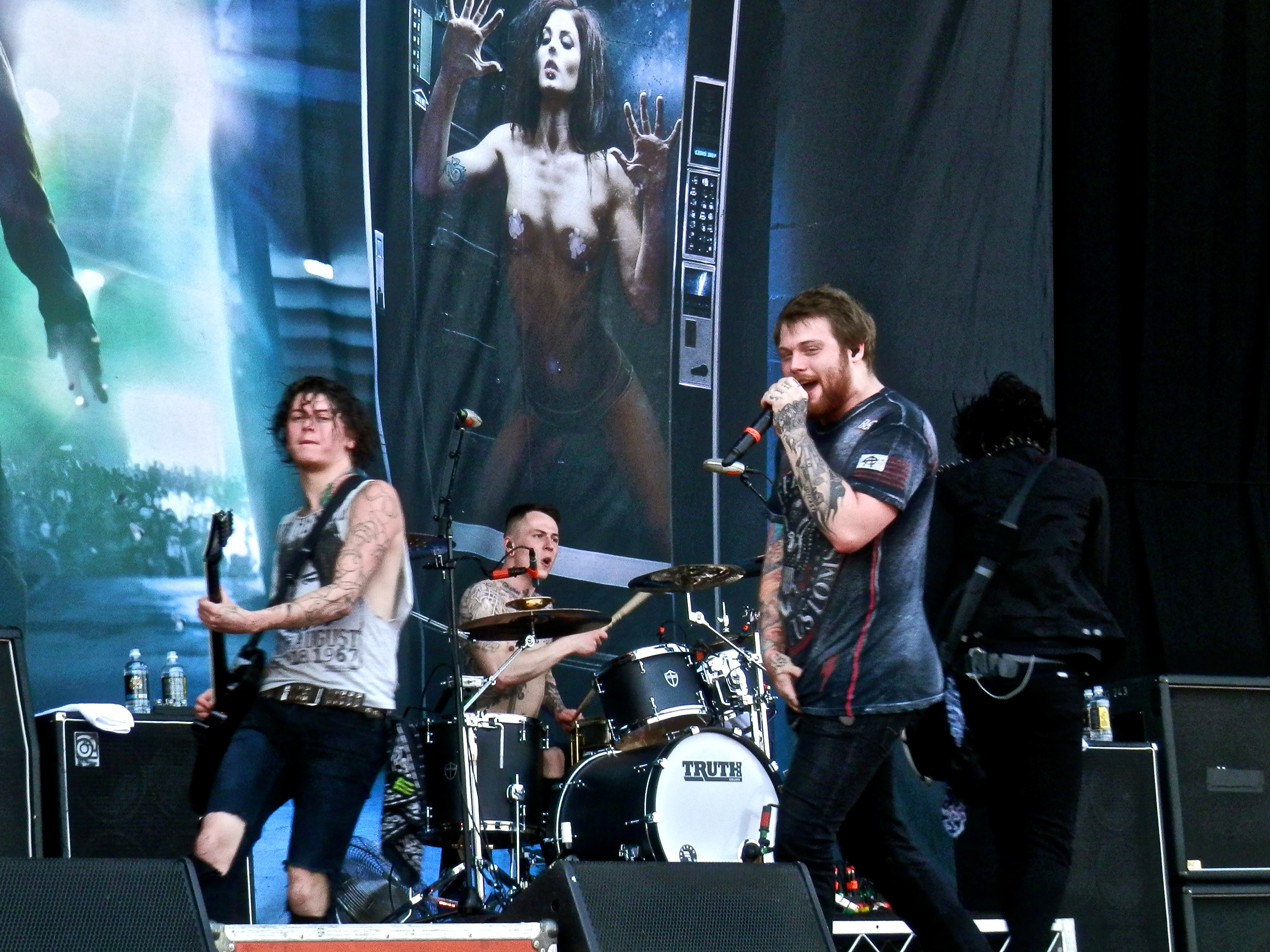
Asking Alexandria

- Joseph Barnby (1838–1896) composer and conductor.
- John Barry (1933–2011)
- Findlay Brown (born 1975)
- Syd Dale (1924–1994)
- Iestyn Davies (born 1979)
- Troy Donockley (born 1964)
- Helen Grime (born 1981)
- Beaumont Hannant (born 1970)
- Låpsley (born 1996)
- Benjamin Francis Leftwich (born 1989)
- Rusko (born 1985)
- The Thrillseekers (born 1973)
- Trevor Watts (born 1939)
- Trevor Wishart (born 1946).

=== Groups ===
- Asking Alexandria
- The Batfish Boys
- Glamour of the Kill
- Elliot Minor
- Mostly Autumn
- The Mood
- The Redskins
- Rick Witter & The Dukes
- RSJ
- The Seahorses
- Shed Seven
- The Smoke
- St. Christopher
- With One Last Breath.

== Historians ==
- Francis Drake (1696–1771), historian of York, Eboracum 1736
- William Arthur Evelyn (1860–1935), historian
- Sir Thomas Herbert, 1st Baronet (1606–1682), traveller, historian and writer.
- John Edward Christopher Hill (1912–2003), Marxist historian
- William Hepworth Thompson (1810–1886), classical scholar.

== Politicians and rulers ==
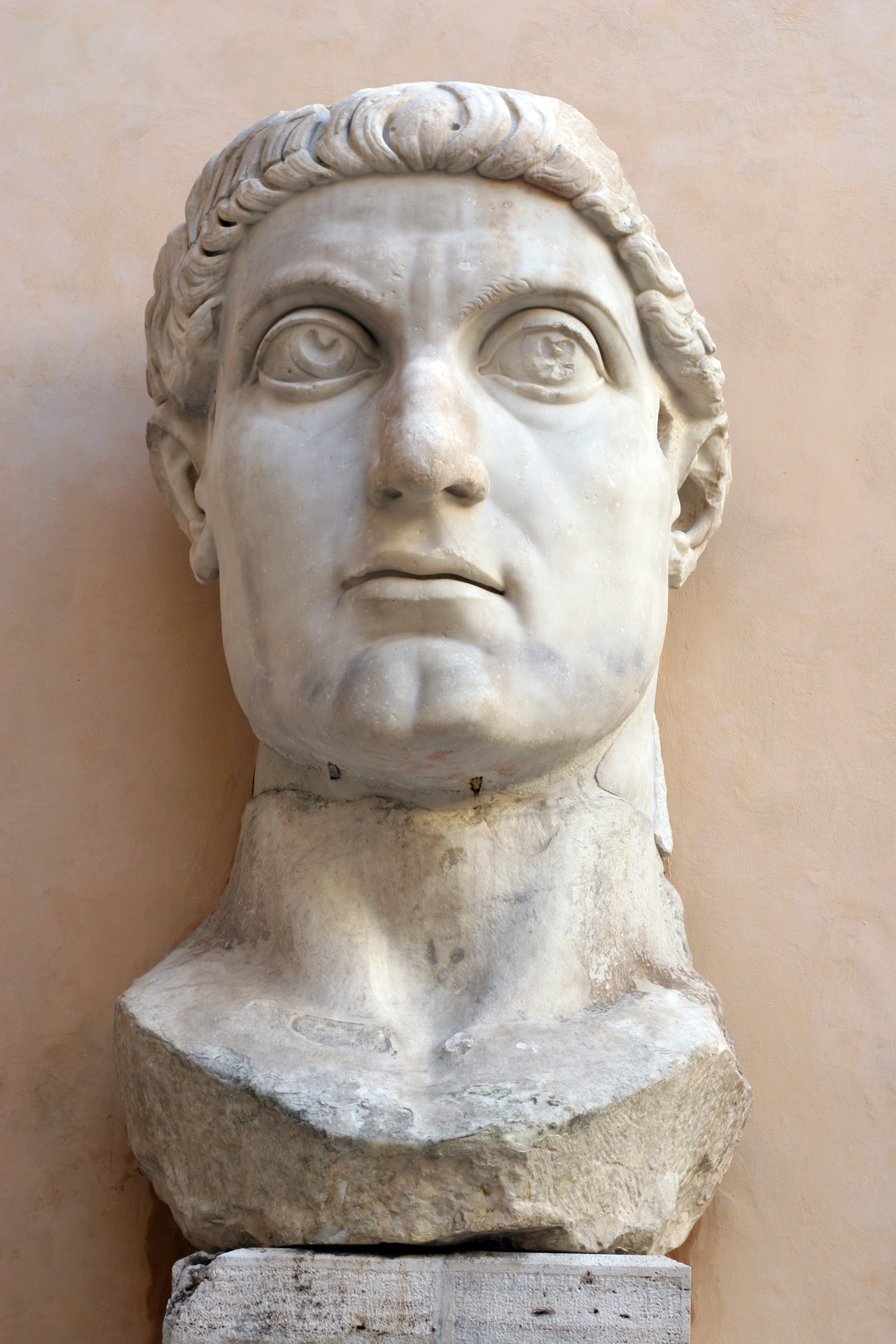
Constantine the Great

- John Aislabie (1670–1742), politician.
- Vincent Cable (born 1943)
- Nicholas Clarevaux (late 13th c.)
- Constantine the Great (AD 272–337), Roman Emperor acclaimed in Eboracum (York)
- David Davis (born 1948)
- Frank Dobson (1940–2019)
- Richard Hotham (1722–1799)
- George Hudson (1800–1871) railway financier and politician.
- Septimius Severus (193–211 in York), Roman Emperor.

== Religion ==
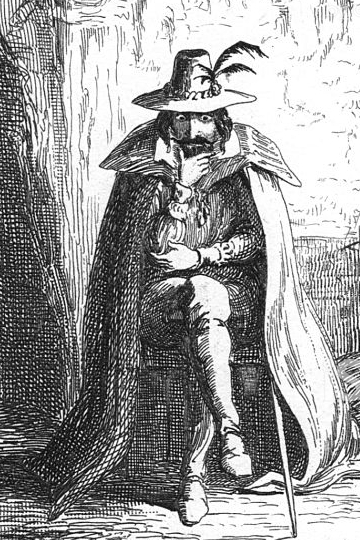
Guy Fawkes

- Aaron of York (c. 1190 – c. 1253), financier and Chief Rabbi of England
- Alcuin (c. 735–804), Christian scholar.
- John Ball (c. 1338–1381), Lollard priest and rebel.
- Margaret Clitherow (died 1586), Catholic saint and martyr
- John Earle (c.1601–1665), bishop and writer on social customs.
- Guy Fawkes (1570–1606), Roman Catholic revolutionary.
- Josce of York (died 1190), Jewish martyr
- John Lyth (1821–1886), first Wesleyan missionary in Germany
- Francis Mason (1799–1874), American missionary.
- Thomas Morton (1564–1659), bishop.
- Matthew Poole (1624–1679), theologian.
- Beilby Porteus (1731–1809), successively Bishop of Chester and of London.
- Richard Sterne (c. 1596–1683), Archbishop of York (1664–83), revised the 1662 Book of Common Prayer.
- William of York (1110–1154), archbishop, patron saint of York.

== Science and architecture ==
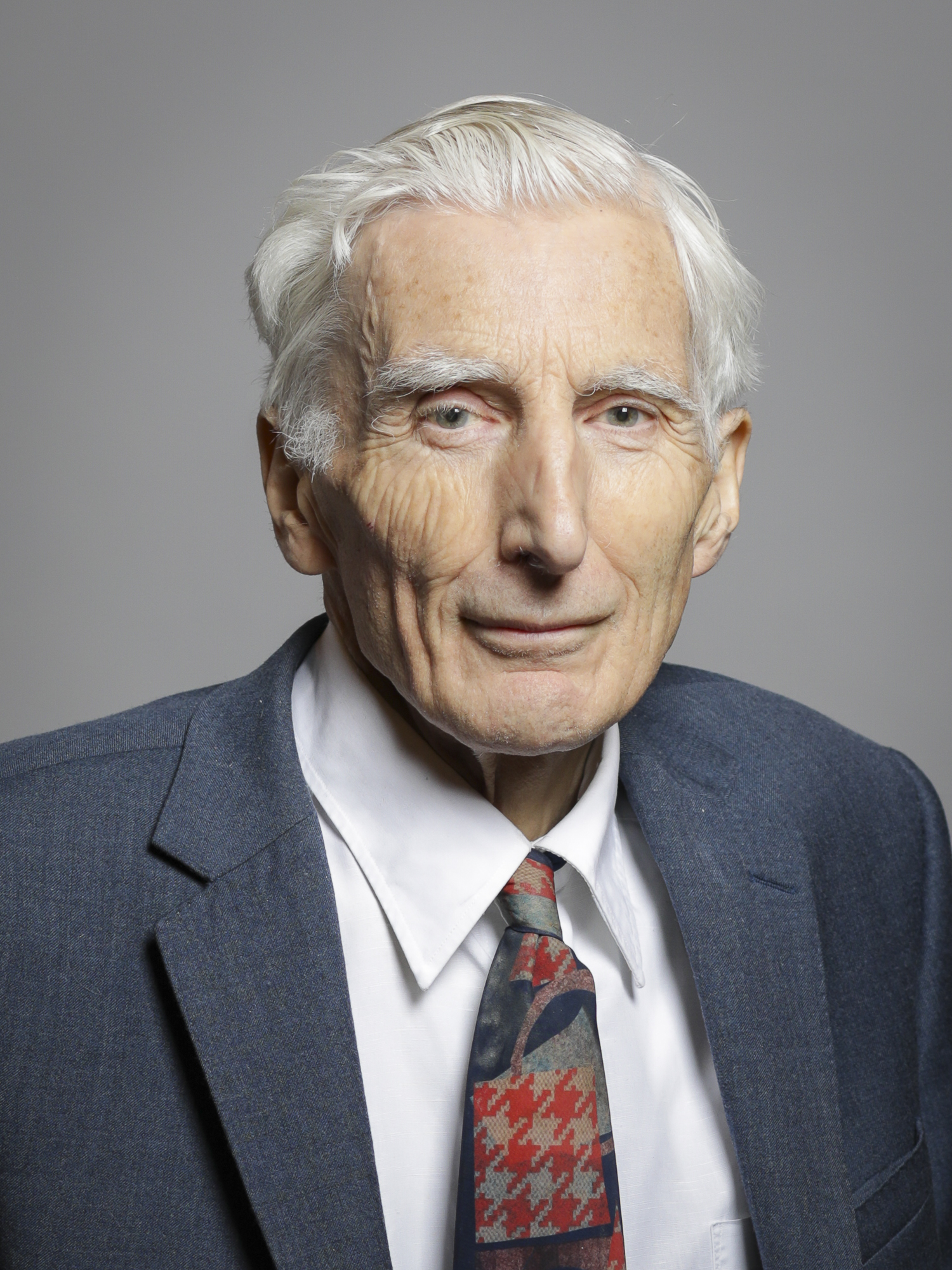
Martin Rees, Lord Rees of Ludlow

- Jocelyn Bell (born 1943), radio astronomer and discoverer of pulsars
- Moses B. Cotsworth (1859 - 1943] Egyptologist and 13-month calendar reformer, inventor of the International Fixed Calendar
- William Etty (c. 1675–1734), architect
- John Goodricke (1764–86), astronomer
- Joseph Hansom (1803–1882), architect and inventor.
- Peter Harrison (1716–1775), architect
- George Hennet (1799–1857), railway contractor and entrepreneur
- Ivar the Boneless (794–872), Viking chieftain.
- Christopher Hill (1912–2003), historian of 17th-century England and Master of Balliol College, Oxford
- John Middleton (1820–1885), architect
- William Parsons, 3rd Earl of Rosse (1800–1867), astronomer.
- Martin Rees (born 1942), Lord Rees of Ludlow, current Astronomer Royal
- George Russell (1857–1951), horticulturalist who developed Russell hybrid lupins
- John Snow (1813–1858), physician.
- Charles Tanford (1921–2009), protein biochemis

== Sport ==
=== Football ===
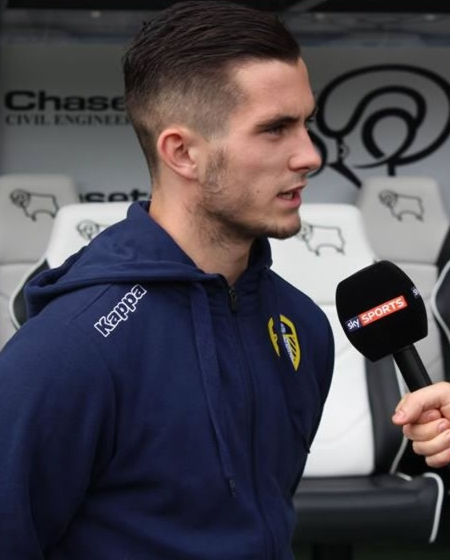
Lewis Cook

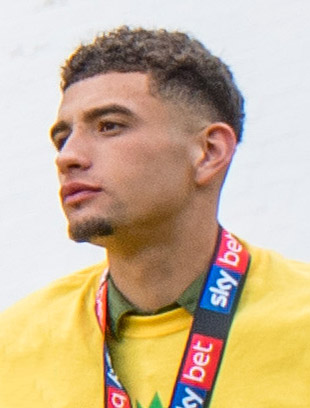
Ben Godfrey

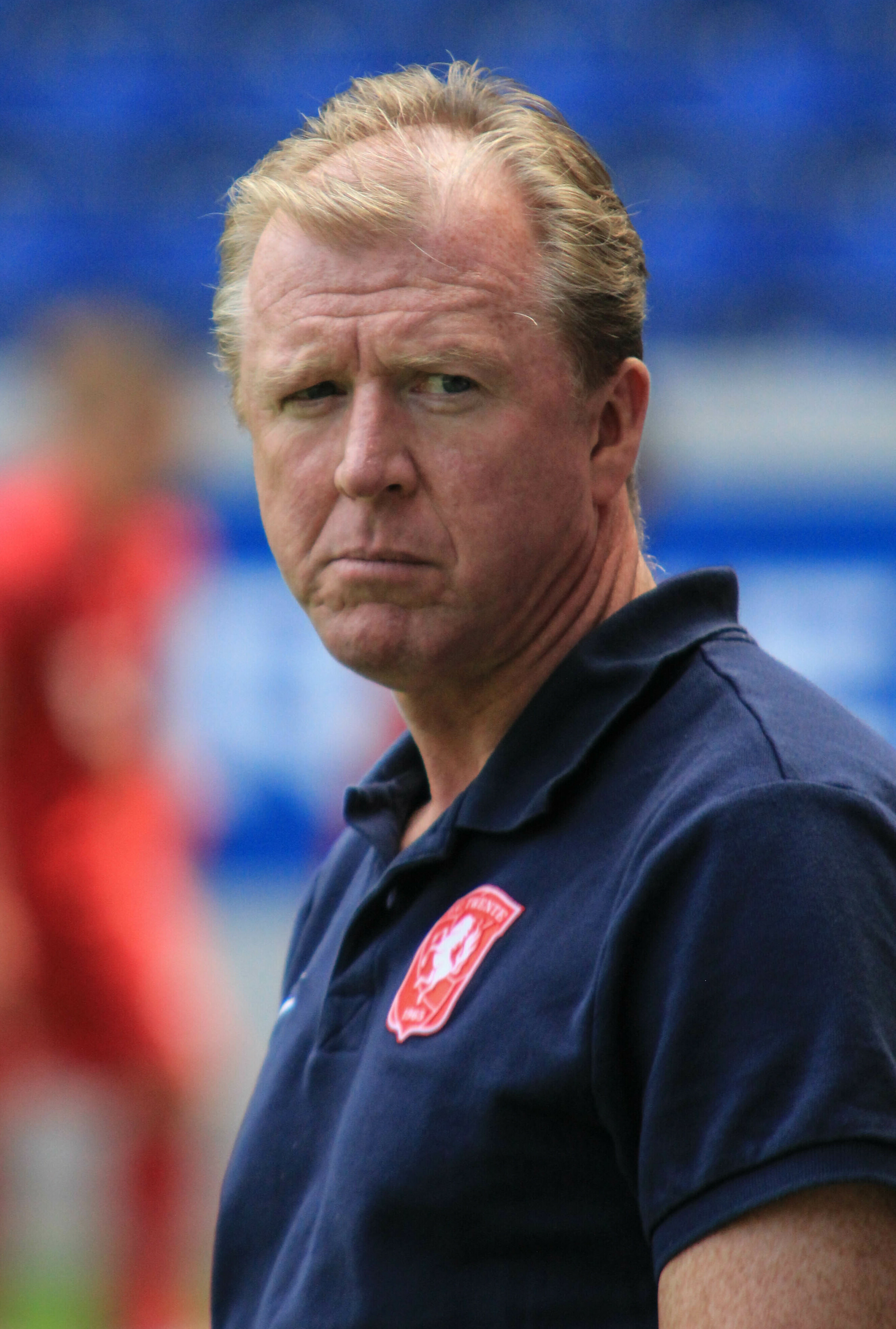
Steve McClaren, in 2012

- Pawel Abbott (born 1982)
- Tom Allan (born 1994)
- Reg Baines (1907–1974)
- Ron Benson (1925–1997)
- Albert Bonass (1911–1945)
- Sam Byram (born 1993)
- Cliff Calvert (born 1954)
- Walter Camidge (1912–1987)
- Jack Clarke (born 2000)
- Lewis Cook (born 1997)
- Nick Culkin (born 1978)
- Andy Dawson (born 1979)
- Richard Dawson (born 1962)
- Michael Duckworth (born 1992)
- David Dunmore (born 1934)
- Iain Dunn (born 1970)
- Bernard Fisher (born 1934)
- Gary Ford (born 1961)
- Martin Fowler (born 1957)
- Martin Garratt (1980–2014)
- Ben Godfrey (born 1998)
- Neil Grayson (born 1964)
- Ross Greenwood (born 1985)
- John Hawksby (born 1942)
- Nick Hendry (1887–1949)
- Simon Heslop (born 1987)
- Jamie Hopcutt (born 1992)
- Russell Howarth (born 1982)
- Niall Huggins (born 2000)
- Will Jarvis (born 2002)
- Mike Johnson (1933–2004)
- Matthew Kilgallon (born 1984)
- George Lee (1919–1991)
- Steve McClaren (born 1961), also manager
- Max McMillan (born 2002)
- George Maskill (1906–1969)
- Tommy Maskill (1903–1956)
- Cliff Mason (1929–2013)
- Alexander Mein (1854–1927)
- Albert Meysey-Thompson (1848–1894)
- Charles Meysey-Thompson (1849–1881)
- Andrew Milne (born 1990)
- Les Milner (1917–1944)
- Bobby Mimms (born 1963)
- Cammy Palmer (born 2000)
- Alf Patrick (1921–2021)
- Shaun Pearson (born 1989)
- Jack Pinder (1912–2004)
- Brian Pollard (born 1954)
- Peter Popely (born 1943)
- John Powell (1936–2017)
- Harvey Rodgers (born 1996)
- George Sharpe (1912–1984)
- Lucy Staniforth (born 1992)
- Reg Stockill (1913–1995)
- Gary Swann (born 1962)
- Barry Tait (born 1938)
- Chris Tate (born 1977)
- Charlie Taylor (born 1993)
- Marc Thompson (born 1982)
- Steve Tutill (born 1969)
- Rory Watson (born 1996)
- Eric Weightman (1910–2002)
- Michael Woods (born 1990)
- Neil Woods (born 1966)

=== Rugby ===
- Peter Fox (born 1984), Wakefield Trinity
- Rob Webber (born 1986), Bath Rugby.

=== Cricket ===
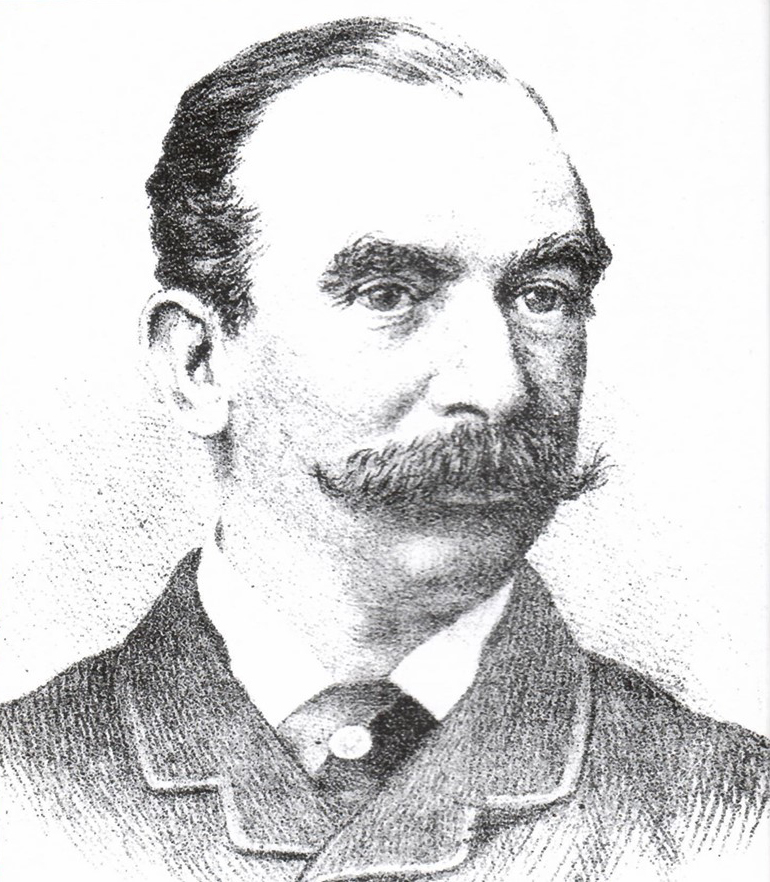
William Prest

- David Alleyne (born 1976)
- Henry Badger (1900–1975)
- Tom Bartram (born 1986)
- Scott Boswell (born 1974)
- Philip Bower (1898–1978)
- Andrew Brewster (born 1977)
- Stephen Coverdale (born 1964)
- Leonard Day (1859–1943)
- Harry Dewse (1836–1910)
- Matthew Fisher (born 1997)
- Paul Gibb (1913–1977)
- Charles Hall (1906–1976)
- John Hicks (1850–1912)
- Tom Loten (born 1999)
- John Nuttall (born 1967)
- Manfred Palmes (1887–1968)
- Charles Prest (1841–1875)
- William Prest (1832–1885)
- Thomas Pride (1864–1919)
- Joseph Sullivan (1890–1932)
- Steven Taylor (born 1963)
- Nick Thornicroft (born 1985)
- Lauren Winfield (born 1990)
- Tim Walton (born 1972)

=== Motor sport ===
- Steve Webster (born 1960).

=== Basketball ===
- Dan Fotu (born 1999)
- Isaac Fotu (born 1993).

=== Boxing ===
- Leo Atang (born 2007).

== Writers ==
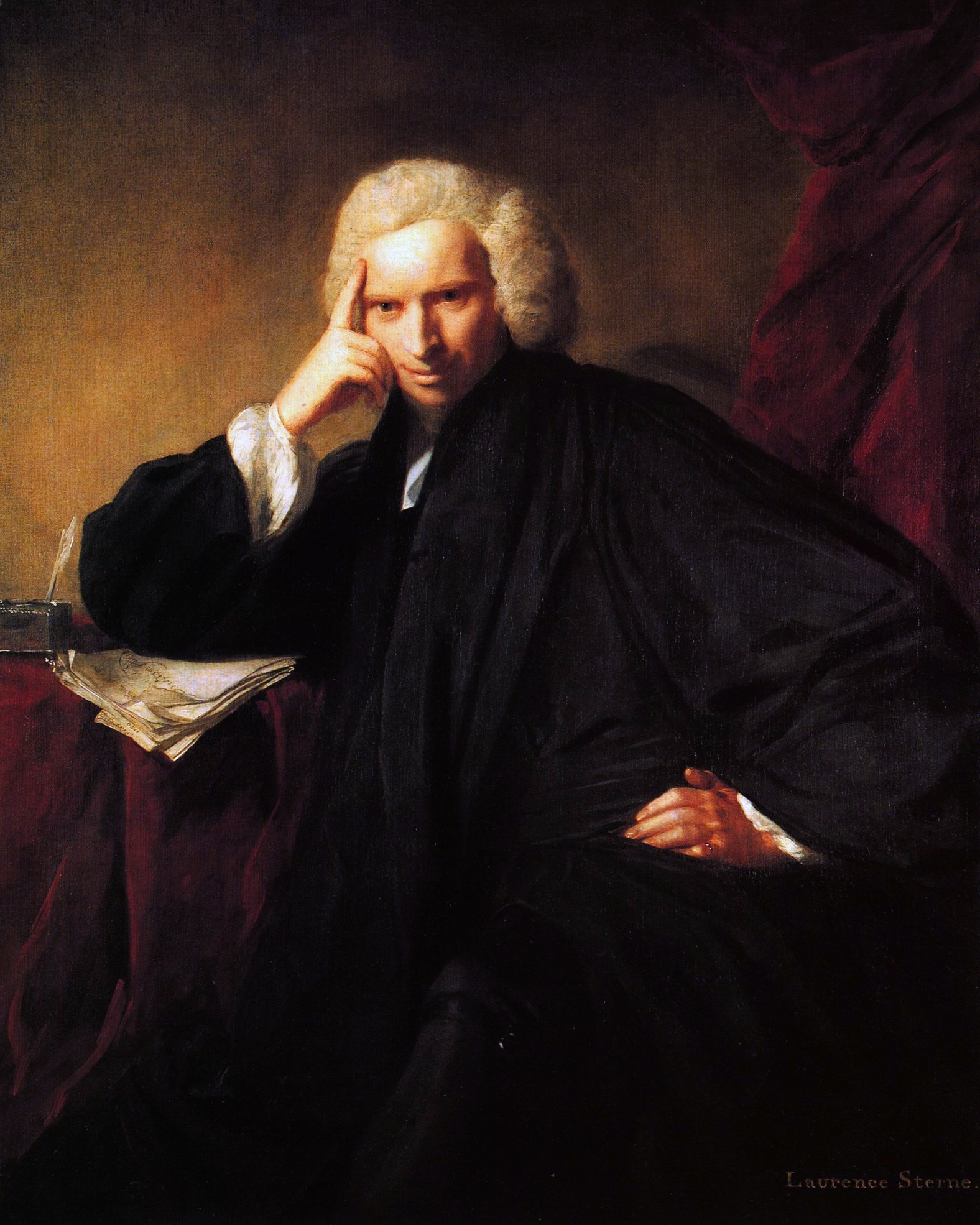
Laurence Sterne, portrait in 1760 by Sir Joshua Reynolds

- Kate Atkinson (born 1951), novelist and playwright
- W. H. Auden (1907–1973), poet and essayist
- Nathan Drake (1766–1836), essayist and physician.
- Matt Haig (born 1975), novelist and journalist
- Justin Hill (born 1971), novelist
- Alison Hume (living), television writer
- Sheelagh Kelly (born 1948), novelist
- Andrew Martin (born 1962), novelist and journalist
- Fiona Mozley (born 1988), novelist
- Laurence Sterne (1713–1768), author of The Life and Opinions of Tristram Shandy, Gentleman.
- J. E. Harold Terry (1885–1939), novelist, playwright and critic
- Silvanus P. Thompson (1851–1916), author and electrical engineer
- Charles Whiting (1926–2007), novelist and military historian.

== Others ==
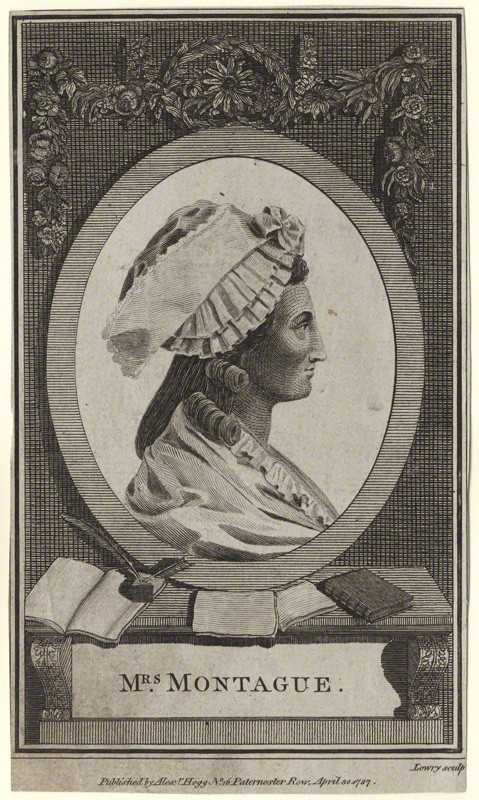
Elizabeth Montagu, engraving 1787

- Benedict of York (died 1189), money lender
- Jon Champion (born 1965), broadcaster
- Captain Christopher Levett (1586–1630), explorer of New England, first settler of York (present-day Portland), Maine, US
- Elizabeth Montagu (1718–1800) social reformer and patron of the arts.
- Guy Mowbray (born 1972), football commentator
- Tessa Rowntree (1909-1999), Quaker, aid worker in Czechoslovakia
- Laura Sayers (born 1978), radio producer and diarist
- Siward, Earl of Northumbria (died 1055), army commander.
- James Hack Tuke (1819–1896), social campaigner.
- Daniel Hack Tuke (1827–1895), social campaigner.
- Henry Tuke (1755–1814), social campaigner.
- Samuel Tuke (1784–1857), social campaigner.
- William Tuke (1732–1822), social campaigner.

== See also ==
- List of alumni of the University of York.
