= Maskill =

Maskill is a surname. Notable people with the surname include:

- Bill Maskill, American football player and coach
- Colin Maskill (born 1964), English rugby league player and coach
- George Maskill (1906–1969), English footballer
- Raymond Maskill (1905–?), English rugby league player
- Tommy Maskill (1903–1956), English footballer
- Tony Maskill (born 1948), Australian photographer
