= David Archibald =

David Archibald may refer to:

- David Archibald (footballer) (1902–1968), Scottish footballer
- David Archibald (politician) (1717–1795), Irish-born farmer and politician
- Dave Archibald (David J. Archibald, born 1969), Canadian ice hockey player
