= Leigh Wood =

Leigh Wood may refer to:

- Leigh Wood (footballer), British footballer
- Leigh Wood (boxer) (born 1988), British boxer
