= Lev Yalcin =

English association football player

Personal information
- Full name: Levent Yalcin
- Date of birth: 25 March 1985 (age 41)
- Place of birth: Middlesbrough, England
- Height: 6 ft 0 in (1.83 m)
- Positions: Midfielder; striker

Youth career
- Newcastle United
- –2002: York City

Senior career*
Years	Team	Apps	(Gls)
2002–2006	York City	62	(2)
2006	Whitby Town	12	(1)
2006–2007	Bishop Auckland	34	(10)
2007	Billingham Synthonia	34	(14)
2007–2011	Stokesley Sports Club		
2011	Spennymoor Town		
2011–2012	Norton & Stockton Ancients	10	(2)
2012–2014	Marske United	8	(3)

International career
2002	Turkey U18	9	(4)
2002–2004	Turkey U19	3	(1)
- * Club domestic league appearances and goals

Levent "Lev" Yalcin (Turkish: Yalçın; born 25 March 1985) is a former professional footballer who played as a midfielder or striker. Born in England, he is a former youth international for Turkey.

== Club career ==
=== York City ===
Yalcin was born in Middlesbrough, Cleveland. He began his career at Newcastle United's centre of excellence before joining York City's youth system. He was called up for North East schools in July 2000, along with teammates Chris Hogg and Graeme Law, which served as a trial for England schools. He was offered a three-year scholarship with York in March 2001, starting for the 2001–02 season. He made his first-team debut as an 84th-minute substitute for Graham Potter in a 1–0 away defeat to Sheffield United in the League Cup first round on 10 September 2002. Aged 17 years and 173 days, he became the eighth-youngest debutant in York's history.

Yalcin agreed to sign his first professional contract with York in March 2004, for the 2004–05 season. He attracted interest from abroad, training with Antalyaspor and Denizlespor for a period in 2004, and Royal Antwerp were also believed to be ready to give him a trial. He was reported to have joined Darlington on a one-month loan in September 2004, but it was later revealed that the deal, which saw David McGurk join York on loan, was only one way and Yalcin had not moved. He went on to score his first goal for York against Morecambe in October 2004. He had a trial at Yeovil Town in January 2005. He signed a new contract with York in June 2005.

=== Non-League football ===
Yalcin was signed by Northern Premier League Premier Division team Whitby Town on 10 February 2006 after he left York by mutual consent. Just days after joining Whitby, Yalcin went on a two-week trial with Hartlepool United. He made his debut in Whitby's 3–2 away win over Wakefield-Emley on 18 March 2006, before scoring his first goal in a 2–0 home win over Frickley Athletic on 26 April. Yalcin finished the 2005–06 season with 12 appearances and one goal for Whitby. He played for Conference North team Scarborough in a pre-season friendly in August 2006, against Whitby, who he played for the previous season. Later that month he signed for Bishop Auckland of the Northern League Division One. Yalcin went on trial with Scunthorpe United of League One in April 2007 before joining Northern League Division One club Billingham Synthonia in August.

Yalcin had moved to Northern League Division Two club Stokesley Sports Club by late 2007. In the 2009–10 season he scored 28 goals from 38 matches for Stokesley, helping them to promotion to Northern League Division One for the first time in their history as Division Two champions. During his time at Stokesley he worked on oil rigs in the North Sea. He signed for Northern League Division One club Spennymoor Town on 5 June 2011 but having not been involved in any fixtures signed for their divisional rivals Norton & Stockton Ancients on 15 September 2011. Yalcin signed for another Northern League Division One club, Marske United, on 23 October 2012, making his debut as a substitute at Bishop Auckland on 17 November. He scored with a powerful low shot in their 2–1 extra time win over Whitley Bay in the 2014 Northern League Challenge Cup final, played at St James' Park on 6 May 2014.

== International career ==
Yalcin was eligible to represent Turkey at international level as his father is Turkish. He made his debut for the Turkey national under-18 team when starting their 0–0 away draw with the Netherlands in a friendly on 6 March 2002. He scored his first goal for them in his following appearance, a 1–1 draw away to Germany in a friendly on 2 April 2002. Yalcin made three appearances at the 2002 Balkan Youth Championship, scoring in Turkey's 1–1 draw with Bulgaria on 7 July 2002 and their 2–0 win over Greece on 9 July. Shortly after the tournament he scored on his debut for the under-19 team, in their 3–1 home victory over Israel on 29 July 2002. In total Yalcin earned nine caps and scored four goals for the under-18s (in 2002) and earned three caps and scored one goal for the under-19s (from 2002 to 2004).

== Career statistics ==
Appearances and goals by club, season and competition
Club	Season	League			FA Cup		League Cup		Other		Total	
Club	Season	Division	Apps	Goals	Apps	Goals	Apps	Goals	Apps	Goals	Apps	Goals
York City	2001–02	Third Division	0	0	0	0	0	0	0	0	0	0
York City	2002–03	Third Division	5	0	0	0	1	0	0	0	6	0
York City	2003–04	Third Division	15	0	0	0	0	0	0	0	15	0
York City	2004–05	Conference National	31	2	1	0	—		1 (Note: Appearance in Football League Trophy)	0	33	2
York City	2005–06	Conference National	11	0	2	0	—		0	0	13	0
York City	Total		62	2	3	0	1	0	1	0	67	2
Whitby Town	2005–06	NPL Premier Division	12	1	—		—		0	0	12	1
Career total			74	3	3	0	1	0	1	0	79	3

== Honours ==
Stokesley Sports Club

- Northern League Division Two: 2009–10

Marske United

- Northern League Challenge Cup: 2013–14
