= Farmery =

Farmery is a surname. Notable people with the surname include:

- Jack Farmery (1901–1971), English professional footballer
- John Farmery (politician) (1591–1647), English politician
- John Farmery (died 1590), English physician
