= John Pinder =

John Pinder or Jack Pinder may refer to:

- John Pinder (RAF officer) (1898–1920), British World War I flying ace
- John J. Pinder, Jr. (1912–1944), American World War II soldier
- Jack Pinder (1912–2004), English professional footballer
- John Pinder (comedy producer) (1945–2015), Australian comedy producer and festival director
- John Pinder II, Bahamian politician
