= Peter Stronach =

English footballer

Personal information
- Full name: Peter Stronach
- Date of birth: 1 September 1956 (age 70)
- Place of birth: Seaham, County Durham, England
- Height: 5 ft 6 in (1.68 m)
- Position: Midfielder

Youth career
- –1973: Sunderland

Senior career*
Years	Team	Apps	(Gls)
1973–1978	Sunderland	3	(0)
1978–1980	York City	34	(2)
1980–?	Chester-le-Street		
Total		37	(2)

International career
1972	England Schoolboys	8	(4)
- * Club domestic league appearances and goals

Peter Stronach (born 1 September 1956) is an English former professional footballer who played as a winger in the Football League for Sunderland and York City, and in non-League football for Chester-le-Street. He was an England schools international.
