= Eddie Legge =

Scottish footballer

Edward Daniel Legge
Personal information
- Full name: Edward Daniel Legge
- Date of birth: 1906
- Place of birth: Aberdeen, Scotland
- Date of death: 16 December 1947 (aged 41)
- Place of death: Aberdeen, Scotland
- Height: 5 ft 10 in (1.78 m)
- Position: Defender

Senior career*
| Years | Team | Apps | (Gls) |
- Balmoral Cecil
- Aberdeen Park Vale
| 1928–1932 | Aberdeen | 46 | (0) |
| 1932–1935 | Carlisle United | 104 | (1) |
| 1935–1938 | York City | 82 | (2) |
| 1938 | Burton Town | | |
| 1938–? | Aberdeen Park Vale | | |
- * Club domestic league appearances and goals

Edward Daniel Legge (1906 – 1947) was a Scottish footballer who played for Aberdeen, Carlisle United and York City in the Football League.

== Career ==
Born in Aberdeen, Legge played for Balmoral Cecil and Aberdeen Park Vale before signing for hometown club Aberdeen in 1928. He joined Carlisle United of the Football League in 1932 and in the league he made 104 appearances and scored one goal for them before joining York City in November 1935 following a trial. He was made captain for the 1936–37 season. Following an injury, he was unable to reaffirm his place in the team, with Claude Barrett and Jack Pinder playing regularly at full back, and he left to join Burton Town in 1938. He joined former club Aberdeen Park Vale in 1938 and died at Foresterhill Hospital in Aberdeen in 1947 at the age of 41.
