= Freddie Scott (footballer) =

English footballer

Personal information
- Full name: Frederick Hind Scott
- Date of birth: 6 October 1916
- Place of birth: Fatfield, County Durham, England
- Date of death: September 1995 (aged 78)
- Place of death: Nottingham, England
- Height: 5 ft 6 in (1.68 m)
- Position: Winger

Senior career*
| Years | Team | Apps | (Gls) |
| –1935 | Fatfield Juniors | | |
| 1935–1936 | Bolton Wanderers | 0 | (0) |
| 1936–1937 | Bradford Park Avenue | 0 | (0) |
| 1937–1946 | York City | 74 | (16) |
| 1946–1957 | Nottingham Forest | 301 | (40) |
| 1957– | Washington Colliery Mechanics | | |
| Total | | 375 | (56) |

International career
- England Schools
- * Club domestic league appearances and goals

Frederick Hind Scott (6 October 1916 – September 1995) was an English professional footballer who played as a winger in the Football League for York City and Nottingham Forest, in non-League football for Fatfield Juniors and Washington Colliery Mechanics and was on the books of Bolton Wanderers and Bradford Park Avenue without making a league appearance. He was an England schools international.
