= Jan Novacki =

English footballer (born 1958)

Personal information
- Full name: Jan Novacki
- Date of birth: 4 December 1958 (age 67)
- Place of birth: Manchester, England
- Height: 5 ft 6 in (1.68 m)
- Position: Winger

Youth career
- 1974–1975: Manchester United
- –1976: Bolton Wanderers

Senior career*
| Years | Team | Apps | (Gls) |
| 1976–1979 | Bolton Wanderers | 0 | (0) |
| 1977–1978 | → York City (loan) | 25 | (3) |
| Total | | 25 | (3) |

International career
| 1977 | England Youth | 6 | (0) |
- * Club domestic league appearances and goals

Jan Novacki (born 4 December 1958) is an English former professional footballer who played as a winger in the Football League for York City and was on the books of Bolton Wanderers without making a league appearance. He was an England youth international.
