= Cliff Rodgers =

English footballer

Personal information
- Full name: Clifford Frederick Rodgers
- Date of birth: 3 October 1921
- Place of birth: Rotherham, West Riding of Yorkshire, England
- Date of death: 1990
- Position: Full back

Senior career*
Years	Team	Apps	(Gls)
	Crystal Palace	0	(0)
–1953	RAF Pocklington		
1945–1947	York City	26	(0)
1947–1948	Scarborough		
1948–????	Goole Town		
Total		26	(0)
- * Club domestic league appearances and goals

Clifford Frederick Rodgers (3 October 1921 – 1990) was an English professional footballer who played as a full back in the Football League for York City, in non-League football for RAF Pocklington, Scarborough and Goole Town and was on the books of Crystal Palace without making a league appearance.
