= Barry Wealthall =

English footballer

Personal information
- Full name: Barry Arthur Wealthall
- Date of birth: 1 May 1942 (age 84)
- Place of birth: Nottingham, Nottinghamshire, England
- Height: 5 ft 9 1/2 in (1.77 m)
- Position: Defender

Senior career*
| Years | Team | Apps | (Gls) |
| 1959–1962 | Nottingham Forest | 2 | (0) |
| 1962–1963 | Grimsby Town | 9 | (0) |
| 1963–1966 | York City | 75 | (0) |
| Total | | 86 | (0) |

International career
| 1959 | England Youth | | |
- * Club domestic league appearances and goals

Barry Arthur Wealthall (born 1 May 1942) is an English former professional footballer who played as a defender in the Football League for Nottingham Forest, Grimsby Town and York City. He was an England youth international.
