= Tommy Gale (footballer, born 1920) =

English footballer

Personal information
- Full name: Thomas Gale
- Date of birth: 4 November 1920
- Place of birth: Washington, England
- Date of death: 29 January 1975 (aged 54)
- Place of death: Bath, England
- Height: 5 ft 10 in (1.78 m)
- Position: Centre half

Senior career*
Years	Team	Apps	(Gls)
- Gateshead
1945–1947	Sheffield Wednesday	6	(0)
1947–1949	York City	76	(0)
- Scarborough
Total		82	(0)
- * Club domestic league appearances and goals

Thomas Gale (4 November 1920 – 29 January 1975) was an English footballer who played for Sheffield Wednesday and York City in the Football League.

== Career ==
Born in Washington, County Durham, Gale played for Gateshead as an amateur before joining Sheffield Wednesday in the Football League in April 1945. He made six league appearances for Wednesday before joining York City in August 1947. He was captain for two seasons, and after making 80 appearances he signed for Scarborough in June 1949.
