= Eric Weightman =

English footballer

Personal information
- Full name: Eric John Weightman
- Date of birth: 4 May 1910
- Place of birth: York, England
- Date of death: January 2002 (aged 91)
- Place of death: Surrey, England
- Position: Left half

Senior career*
Years	Team	Apps	(Gls)
–1933	Scarborough		
1933–1935	Middlesbrough	3	(0)
1935–1939	Chesterfield	79	(1)
1939–1940	Notts County	0	(0)
- * Club domestic league appearances and goals

Eric John Weightman (4 May 1910 – January 2002) was an English professional footballer who played in the Football League for Chesterfield and Middlesbrough as a left half.

== Career statistics ==
Appearances and goals by club, season and competition
Club	Season	League			FA Cup		Other		Total	
Club	Season	Division	Apps	Goals	Apps	Goals	Apps	Goals	Apps	Goals
Middlesbrough	1933–34	First Division	1	0	0	0	―		1	0
Middlesbrough	1935–36	First Division	2	0	1	0	―		3	0
Middlesbrough	Total		3	0	1	0	―		4	0
Chesterfield	1936–37	Second Division	29	0	1	0	1 (Note: Appearance in Mansfield Charity Cup)	0	31	0
Chesterfield	1937–38	Second Division	16	1	2	0	1 (Note: Appearance in Chesterfield Senior Cup)	0	19	1
Chesterfield	1938–39	Second Division	34	0	2	0	1 (Note: Appearance in Chesterfield Hospital Cup)	0	37	0
Chesterfield	Total		79	1	5	0	3	0	87	1
Career total			82	1	6	0	3	0	91	1

== Honours ==
Chesterfield

- Mansfield Charity Cup: 1936–37
- Chesterfield Senior Cup: 1937–38
- Chesterfield Hospital Cup: 1938–39
