= George Sayles =

English footballer and cricketer (1899–1971)

Personal information
- Full name: George Sayles
- Date of birth: 26 March 1899
- Place of birth: Sheffield, West Riding of Yorkshire, England
- Date of death: June 1971 (aged 72)
- Place of death: Wokingham, Berkshire, England
- Position: Full back

Senior career*
Years	Team	Apps	(Gls)
1920–1921	Cardiff City	0	(0)
1921–1924	Reading	21	(0)
1924–1925	York City	52	(0)
1925–	Reading	0	(0)
Total		73	(0)
- * Club domestic league appearances and goals

George Sayles (26 March 1899 – June 1971) was an English professional footballer. He played as a full back in the Football League for Reading, and in non-League football for York City. He was on the books of Cardiff City without making a league appearance.

He also played minor counties cricket for Berkshire from 1928 to 1949, making a total of 76 appearances in the Minor Counties Championship.
