= Walter Porritt =

English footballer

Personal information
- Full name: Walter Porritt
- Date of birth: 19 July 1914
- Place of birth: Heckmondwike, England
- Date of death: 1993 (aged 78–79)
- Height: 5 ft 6 in (1.68 m)
- Positions: Winger; inside forward

Senior career*
Years	Team	Apps	(Gls)
1935–1936	Huddersfield Town	0	(0)
1936–1947	York City	40	(5)
Total		40	(5)
- * Club domestic league appearances and goals

Walter Porritt (19 July 1914 – 1993) was an English professional footballer who played as a winger or an inside forward in the Football League for York City and was on the books of Huddersfield Town without making a league appearance.
