= Joe Laws (footballer) =

English footballer

Personal information
- Full name: Joseph Minto Laws
- Date of birth: 6 July 1897
- Place of birth: Cornsay Colliery, England
- Date of death: 29 August 1952 (aged 55)
- Place of death: Buxton, England
- Height: 5 ft 3 in (1.60 m)
- Position: Winger

Senior career*
Years	Team	Apps	(Gls)
1920–1921	Spennymoor United		
1921–1923	Grimsby Town	53	(5)
1923–1924	Worksop Town		
1924–1926	York City		
1926–1927	Nottingham Forest	7	(1)
1927–1929	Southport	81	(11)
1929–1930	Macclesfield	42	(13)
1930–1931	Ashton National		
1931–1932	Macclesfield	2	(2)
1932–1933	Chorley		
- * Club domestic league appearances and goals

Joseph Minto Laws (6 July 1897 – 29 August 1952) was an English professional footballer who played as a winger.
