= John Stainsby =

English footballer

Personal information
- Full name: John Stainsby
- Date of birth: 25 September 1937
- Place of birth: Stairfoot, West Riding of Yorkshire, England
- Date of death: q3 2000
- Place of death: Barnsley, South Yorkshire, England
- Height: 5 ft 10 in (1.78 m)
- Position: Striker

Senior career*
Years	Team	Apps	(Gls)
	Wolverhampton Wanderers	0	(0)
–1955	Wath Athletic		
1955–1961	Barnsley	34	(12)
1961–1963	York City	69	(21)
1963–1964	Stockport County	5	(0)
Total		108	(33)
- * Club domestic league appearances and goals

John Stainsby (25 September 1937 – 2000) was an English professional footballer who played as a striker in the Football League for Barnsley, York City and Stockport County, in non-League football for Wath Athletic and was on the books of Wolverhampton Wanderers without making a league appearance.
