= Percy Reed =

English footballer

Personal information
- Full name: Percy Reed
- Date of birth: 5 December 1890
- Place of birth: Sheffield, West Riding of Yorkshire, England
- Date of death: 4 August 1970 (aged 79)
- Place of death: Sheffield, West Riding of Yorkshire, England
- Height: 5 ft 5 in (1.65 m)
- Position: Half-back

Senior career*
Years	Team	Apps	(Gls)
–1919	Royal Navy		
1919–1921	Sheffield Wednesday	14	(0)
1921–1922	Chesterfield	5	(0)
1922	Doncaster Rovers		(1)
1922–1923	Denaby United		
1923–1924	York City	30	(0)
Total		49	(1)
- * Club domestic league appearances and goals

Percy Reed (5 December 1890 – 4 August 1970) was an English professional footballer who played as a half-back in the Football League for Sheffield Wednesday and Chesterfield and in non-League football for Royal Navy, Doncaster Rovers, Denaby United and York City.
