= Les Porter =

English footballer

Personal information
- Full name: Leslie Porter
- Date of birth: 5 May 1923
- Place of birth: Gateshead, County Durham, England
- Date of death: November 2002 (aged 78–79)
- Place of death: Middlesbrough, North Yorkshire, England
- Height: 5 ft 9 in (1.75 m)
- Position: Half-back

Youth career
- Yoker FC

Senior career*
Years	Team	Apps	(Gls)
–1944	Redheugh Works		
1944–1949	Newcastle United	0	(0)
1949–1954	York City	38	(1)
1954–????	North Shields		
Total		38	(1)
- * Club domestic league appearances and goals

Leslie Porter (5 May 1923 – November 2002) was an English professional footballer who played as a half-back in the Football League for York City, in non-League football for Redheugh Works and North Shields and was on the books of Newcastle United without making a league appearance.
