= Bill Smith (footballer, born 1897) =

English footballer

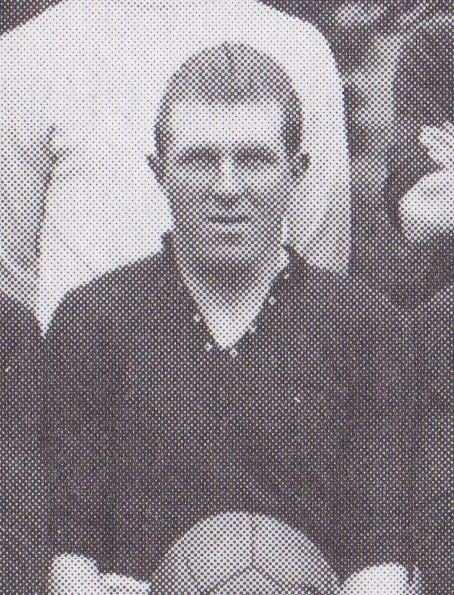
- Smith lining up for York City in 1922

Personal information
- Full name: William Thomas Smith
- Date of birth: 9 April 1897
- Place of birth: Langley Park, England
- Height: 5 ft 8 1/2 in (1.74 m)
- Positions: Centre half; wing half

Senior career*
Years	Team	Apps	(Gls)
1919–	Hull City	0	(0)
–1921	Leadgate Park		
1921–1922	Durham City	33	(3)
1922–1925	York City	75	(4)
1925–	Stockport County	0	(0)
- * Club domestic league appearances and goals

William Thomas Smith (9 April 1897 – after 1924) was an English professional footballer.

== Career ==
During his amateur career, Smith played in 17 finals, and captained the Third Army team in Germany when he was stationed in Koblenz after the armistice during the First World War. He started his professional career with Hull City in 1921. After making no appearances for the club, he joined Leadgate Park. He joined Durham City in 1921, making 33 league appearances in the club's first season in the Football League.

He joined York City in the Midland League in July 1922, where he scored the club's first goal in that competition. He made 75 appearances for the club in the Midland League and five appearances in the FA Cup before joining Stockport County in 1925, where he made no league appearances.
