= Charles Elliott (footballer) =

English footballer

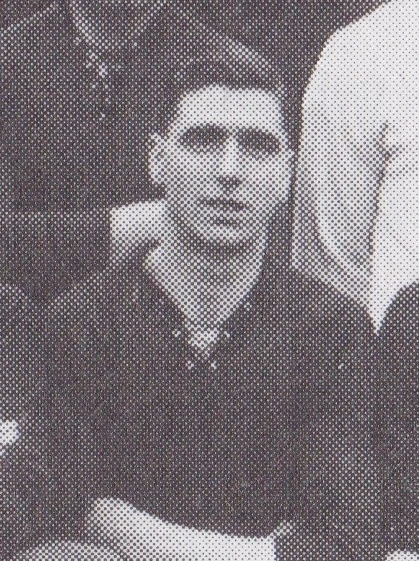
- Elliott lining up for York City in 1922

Personal information
- Date of birth: 22 September 1896
- Place of birth: Sheffield, England
- Date of death: 22 March 1940 (aged 43)
- Place of death: Sheffield, England
- Positions: Striker; outside forward

Senior career*
| Years | Team | Apps | (Gls) |
| | Sheffield United | 0 | (0) |
| –1921 | Rotherham Town | | |
| 1921–1922 | Rotherham County | 5 | (1) |
| 1922–1925 | York City | 81 | (25) |
- * Club domestic league appearances and goals

Charles Elliott (22 September 1896 – 22 March 1940) was an English professional footballer.

== Career ==
Elliott started his career with Sheffield United and later joined Rotherham Town. He joined Rotherham County in the Second Division in 1921, where he made five appearances and scored one goal during the 1921–22 season, after which he joined York City for their first season in the Midland League in August 1922. He finished his first season with the club as their top scorer with 16 goal and finished his York career with 89 appearances and 27 goals in all competitions.
