= Campbell McMurray =

Scottish footballer

Personal information
- Full name: Campbell McMurray
- Date of birth: 27 June 1893
- Place of birth: Glasgow, Scotland
- Height: 5 ft 10 in (1.78 m)
- Positions: Half-back; full back

Senior career*
Years	Team	Apps	(Gls)
- Vale of Leven
- Strathclyde
–1920	Ashfield		
1920–1922	Hull City	4	(0)
1922–1923	Workington		
1923–1924	York City	42	(0)
1924–1925	Workington		
1925–1926	New Brighton	1	(0)
Total		47	(0)
- * Club domestic league appearances and goals

Campbell McMurray (27 June 1893 – ?) was a Scottish professional footballer who played as a half-back or a full back in the Football League for Hull City and New Brighton, in non-League football for Workington and York City and in Scottish football for Vale of Leven, Strathclyde and Ashfield.
