= Ted Thorpe (footballer, born 1898) =

English footballer

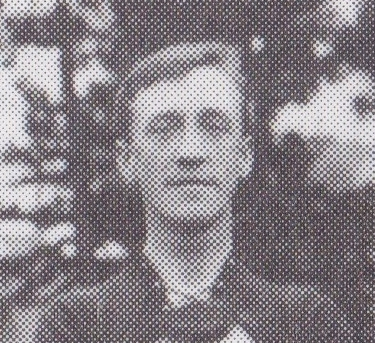
- Thorpe lining up for York City in 1922

Personal information
- Full name: Edwin Thorpe
- Date of birth: 1898
- Place of birth: Kiveton Park, Rotherham, England
- Position: Full back

Senior career*
Years	Team	Apps	(Gls)
–1919	Sheffield Wednesday	0	(0)
1919–1921	Lincoln City	12	(0)
1921–1922	Doncaster Rovers		(0)
1922–1923	York City	41	(0)
1923–1924	Reading	3	(0)
Total		56	(0)
- * Club domestic league appearances and goals

Edwin "Ted" Thorpe (born 1898, date of death unknown) was an English professional footballer.

== Career ==
Thorpe started his career with Sheffield Wednesday during the First World War. He then joined Lincoln City in June 1919, where he played for two seasons. He made 12 league appearances for the club and joined Doncaster Rovers in July 1921, playing for them for one season before joining York City for their first season in the Midland League in August 1922. He missed just one game during this season, proving to be solid and consistent. After making 41 appearances that season, he joined Reading in August 1923, where he made three league appearances.
