= David Archibald (footballer) =

Scottish footballer (1902–1968)

Personal information
- Full name: David Kerr Archibald
- Date of birth: 20 September 1902
- Place of birth: Glasgow, Scotland
- Date of death: 1968 (aged 65)
- Place of death: Glasgow, Scotland
- Height: 5 ft 8 1/2 in (1.74 m)
- Position: Full back

Senior career*
Years	Team	Apps	(Gls)
–1926	Parkhead		
1926–1928	Morton (Note: The Morton appearances and goals only cover the 1926–27 season.)	33	(1)
1928–1929	New York Nationals	4	(0)
1929	Clyde (trial)		
1929–1933	York City	85	(0)
1933–????	Shelbourne		
Total		122	(1)
- * Club domestic league appearances and goals

David Kerr Archibald (20 September 1902 – 1968) was a Scottish professional footballer who played as a full back in Scottish football for Parkhead, Morton and Clyde, in the Football League for York City, in American football for the New York Nationals and in Irish football for Shelbourne. Archibald died in Glasgow in 1968, at the age of 65.
