= Graeme Law =

Scottish footballer

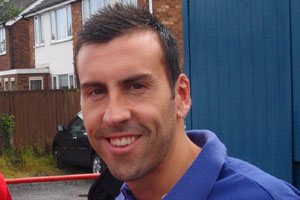
- Law in 2012

Personal information
- Full name: Graeme Christopher Law
- Date of birth: 6 October 1984 (age 42)
- Place of birth: Kirkcaldy, Scotland
- Height: 5 ft 10 in (1.78 m)
- Position: Defender

Youth career
- –2003: York City

Senior career*
Years	Team	Apps	(Gls)
2003–2006	York City	35	(0)
2006	Dundee	3	(0)
2006–2007	Tamworth	27	(1)
2007	Farsley Celtic	2	(0)
2007	→ Tamworth (loan)		
2007–2009	Tamworth		
2009–2010	Stalybridge Celtic		
2010–2012	Northwich Victoria		
2012–2013	Tamworth	0	(0)

International career
2002	Scotland U19	4	(0)
Medal record
Representing Great Britain
World University Games
Silver medal – second place	2011 Shenzhen	Men's Team
- * Club domestic league appearances and goals

Graeme Christopher Law (born 6 October 1984) is a Scottish former professional footballer who plays as a defender. He was most recently player-assistant coach for Tamworth.

Law played for York City, Dundee, Tamworth, Farsley Celtic and Northwich Victoria. He played in The Football League during the 2003–04 season for York and represented Scotland at under-19 level four times.

== Club career ==
=== Tamworth ===
On 30 October 2007, Law returned to Staffordshire side Tamworth on loan. A month later it was confirmed that Law had signed a permanent deal to re-join Tamworth after impressing whilst on loan, signing a deal that would keep him at the club until the end of the 2007–08 season.

On 3 June 2008, Law agreed a new deal with Tamworth keeping him at the club until the end of the 2008–09 season, in which Tamworth were promoted to the Conference Premier after winning the Conference North championship.

=== Later career ===
In August 2009 he joined Stalybridge Celtic before in December 2010 switching to Northwich Victoria.

== International career ==
Law made his debut for the Scotland under-19 team in a 2–1 victory over Switzerland on 25 September. He made three appearances in 2002 UEFA European Under-19 Football Championship qualification, finishing his under-19 career with four caps.

== Coaching career ==
On 1 July 2012, Law returned to Tamworth, to work alongside his namesake Marcus as the club's new assistant coach.

== Personal life ==
Law studied for a Bachelor of Arts degree in Physical Education and Sports Coaching at York St John University. Following this, he graduated from the University of Chester with a Master's degree in the Sociology of Sport and Exercise. Additionally, Law completed a Doctor of Philosophy degree at the same university, where he studied the relationship between football players and the monetization of social relationships. In April 2016, his PhD paper on footballers, money and gambling received national press coverage.

== Honours ==
Tamworth

- Conference North: 2008–09
