= Andy Dawson (footballer, born 1979) =

English footballer

Personal information
- Full name: Andrew Stephen Dawson
- Date of birth: 8 December 1979 (age 46)
- Place of birth: York, England
- Height: 6 ft 0 in (1.83 m)
- Positions: Defender; midfielder

Youth career
- –1998: York City

Senior career*
Years	Team	Apps	(Gls)
1998–2000	York City	28	(1)
2000–2001	Carlisle United	0	(0)
2001–	Scarborough	6	(0)
Total		34	(1)
- * Club domestic league appearances and goals

Andrew Stephen Dawson (born 8 December 1979) is an English former professional footballer who played as a defender or a midfielder in the Football League for York City, in non-League football for Scarborough, and was on the books of Carlisle United without making a league appearance.
