= George Sharpe (footballer) =

English footballer (1912–1984)

Personal information
- Full name: George William Sharpe
- Date of birth: 2 September 1912
- Place of birth: York, England
- Date of death: 21 January 1984 (aged 71)
- Place of death: York, North Yorkshire, England
- Height: 5 ft 10 in (1.78 m)
- Positions: Inside forward; outside forward

Senior career*
Years	Team	Apps	(Gls)
1928–1931	York City	25	(2)
1934–????	Selby Town		
Total		25	(2)
- * Club domestic league appearances and goals

George William Sharpe (2 September 1912 – 21 January 1984) was an English professional footballer who played as an inside forward or an outside forward in the Football League for York City and in non-League football for Selby Town.
