= George Maskill =

English footballer

Personal information
- Full name: George Maskill
- Date of birth: 4 October 1906
- Place of birth: York, England
- Date of death: 28 November 1969 (aged 63)
- Place of death: Harrogate, West Riding of Yorkshire, England
- Height: 5 ft 8 in (1.73 m)
- Position: Half-back

Senior career*
Years	Team	Apps	(Gls)
–1922	Acomb WMC		
1922–1927	York City	82	(0)
1927–1932	Scarborough		
1932–1936	York City	3	(0)
1936–	York Post Office		
Total		85	(0)
- * Club domestic league appearances and goals

George Maskill (4 October 1906 – 28 November 1969) was an English amateur footballer who played as a half-back in the Football League for York City and in non-League football for Acomb WMC, Scarborough and York Post Office. He was an England schoolboy international.
