= Jack Pinder =

English footballer

Personal information
- Full name: John James Pinder
- Date of birth: 1 December 1912
- Place of birth: Acomb, England
- Date of death: 19 August 2004 (aged 91)
- Place of death: York, England
- Height: 5 ft 9 in (1.75 m)
- Position: Full-back

Senior career*
Years	Team	Apps	(Gls)
1929–1948	York City	199	(4)

International career
- England schools
- * Club domestic league appearances and goals

John James Pinder (1 December 1912 – 19 August 2004) was an English professional footballer who played as a full-back.

== Career ==
Born in Acomb, Pinder spent his whole career at York City, with whom he made a total of 221 appearances and scored four goals. He was famed for his tough-tackling no-nonsense defending and truly was one of his era. He also was capped by England at schoolboy level.

Pinder died on 19 August 2004 at the age of 91 in York District Hospital after suffering a perforated bowel.
