= Nick Hendry =

English footballer

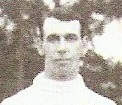

Personal information
- Full name: Conal Nicholson Hendry
- Date of birth: 1887
- Place of birth: York, England
- Date of death: 9 April 1949 (aged 61–62)
- Height: 5 ft 10 1/2 in (1.79 m)
- Position: Goalkeeper

Senior career*
Years	Team	Apps	(Gls)
?–1907	North Eastern Railway United	?	(?)
1907–1908	Middlesbrough	0	(0)
1908–1910	Darlington	?	(?)
1910–1920	Hull City	140	(0)
1921–1922	Doncaster Rovers	?	(0)
1922–1924	York City	56	(0)
- * Club domestic league appearances and goals

Conal Nicholson "Nick" Hendry (1887 – 9 April 1949) was an English footballer who played as a goalkeeper.

== Career ==
Hendry started his career with North Eastern Railway United, with whom he won the York and District League in the 1905–06 season. He joined Middlesbrough as an amateur in 1907, but failed to make any appearances in the league for the team. He then moved to Darlington in 1908, where he played until joining Hull City in March 1910. Here, he became one of the first York-born footballers to play in the Football League and was dubbed "the human octopus" because of his displays for the club.

He made 140 league appearances for Hull, 98 of which were consecutive. He made 271 appearances in first-team and war football for Hull, leaving the club in 1920, after which he spent a season with Doncaster Rovers. He joined York City in July 1922 for their first season in the Midland League and advised the club on team selection. He left the club in 1924 after making 56 appearances in the Midland League for York and later became a trainer at LNER Permanent Way.
