= Peter Popely =

English footballer

Personal information
- Full name: Peter Charles Francis Popely
- Date of birth: 7 April 1943 (age 83)
- Place of birth: York, England
- Height: 5 ft 10 in (1.78 m)
- Position: Defender

Senior career*
Years	Team	Apps	(Gls)
–1962	Cliftonville		
1962–1967	York City	25	(0)
Total		25	(0)
- * Club domestic league appearances and goals

Peter Charles Francis Popely (born 7 April 1943) is an English former professional footballer who played as a defender in the Football League for York City and in non-League football for Cliftonville. Peter died suddenly on 3 August 2024.
