= Richard Dawson (footballer, born 1962) =

English footballer and manager

Personal information
- Full name: Richard Dawson
- Date of birth: 6 July 1962 (age 64)
- Place of birth: York, England
- Height: 5 ft 11 in (1.80 m)
- Position: Defender

Senior career*
Years	Team	Apps	(Gls)
–1980	New Earswick		
1980–1983	York City	48	(0)
1983–	Scarborough	143	(8)
	Frickley Athletic	13	(0)
	Boston United	30	(0)
- Goole Town
	Chorley	17	(3)
- Northwich Victoria
- Harrogate Town
- Goole Town
1994	Mossley		
Total		251	(11)

Managerial career
- Bridlington Town
- 1994: Mossley
- * Club domestic league appearances and goals

Richard Dawson (born 6 July 1962) is an English former professional footballer who played as a defender in the Football League for York City and in non-League football for New Earswick, Scarborough, Frickley Athletic, Boston United, Goole Town, Chorley, Northwich Victoria and Harrogate Town.

He also briefly managed Bridlington Town and was player-manager for Mossley A.F.C. in 1994.
