= John Powell (footballer, born 1936) =

English footballer (1936–2017)

Personal information
- Full name: Brian John Edward Powell
- Date of birth: 10 March 1936 (age 90)
- Place of birth: York, England
- Date of death: 25 December 2017 (aged 81)
- Height: 5 ft 8 in (1.73 m)
- Position: Winger

Senior career*
Years	Team	Apps	(Gls)
- White Rose
–1955	Cliftonville		
1955–1960	York City	27	(5)
1960–1963	Scarborough	157	(64)
1963–1969	Goole Town		
1969–????	Boston United		
Total		27	(5)
- * Club domestic league appearances and goals

Brian John Edward Powell (10 March 1936 – 25 December 2017) was an English semi-professional footballer who played as a winger in the Football League for York City and in non-League football for White Rose, Cliftonville, Scarborough, Goole Town and Boston United.
