= Leigh Wood (footballer) =

English footballer

Personal information
- Full name: Leigh James Wood
- Date of birth: 21 May 1983 (age 43)
- Place of birth: Selby, England
- Position: Midfielder

Senior career*
| Years | Team | Apps | (Gls) |
| 1999–2004 | York City | 64 | (0) |
| 2004–2008 | Harrogate Town | 122 | (3) |
- * Club domestic league appearances and goals as of 21:54, 19 September 2007 (UTC)

Leigh James Wood (born 21 May 1983 in Selby, England) is an English footballer, who plays for Selby Town FC after leaving Harrogate Town. He is at home anywhere in the centre of defence or midfield.

Leigh was released by York City in May 2004. He later joined Harrogate Town. He left the club in June 2008.
