= Jack Farmery =

English footballer

Personal information
- Full name: Lionel John Victor Farmery
- Date of birth: 25 April 1901
- Place of birth: Bentley, West Riding of Yorkshire, England
- Date of death: q1 1971
- Place of death: Northampton, Northamptonshire, England
- Height: 6 ft 0 in (1.83 m)
- Position: Goalkeeper

Senior career*
Years	Team	Apps	(Gls)
1924–1925	Hull City	0	(0)
1925–1926	Bradford City	0	(0)
1926–1929	Doncaster Rovers	33	(0)
1929–1931	York City	67	(0)
1931–	Bentley Colliery		
Total		100	(0)
- * Club domestic league appearances and goals

Lionel John Victor Farmery (25 April 1901 – q1 1971) was an English professional footballer who played as a goalkeeper in the Football League for Doncaster Rovers and York City, in non-League football for Bentley Colliery and was on the books of Hull City and Bradford City without making a league appearance.
