= Martin Garratt =

English association football player (1980-2014)

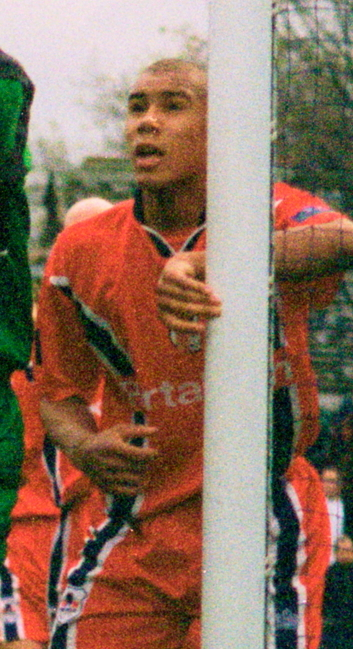
- Garratt playing for York City in 1998

Personal information
- Full name: Martin Blake George Garratt
- Date of birth: 22 February 1980
- Place of birth: York, England
- Date of death: 24 October 2014 (aged 34)
- Place of death: Middlesbrough, England
- Height: 5 ft 8 in (1.73 m)
- Position: Midfielder

Youth career
- 1996–1998: York City

Senior career*
Years	Team	Apps	(Gls)
1998–2000	York City	45	(1)
2000	Mansfield Town	6	(0)
2000	St Patrick's Athletic	3	(0)
2000–2001	Lincoln City	2	(0)
2001	→ Hednesford Town (loan)	2	(0)
2002	North Ferriby United		
Total		58	(1)
- * Club domestic league appearances and goals

Martin Blake George Garratt (22 February 1980 – 24 October 2014) was an English professional footballer who played as a midfielder in the Football League for York City, Mansfield Town and Lincoln City.

== Career ==
Born in York, Garratt grew up in Middlesbrough and he joined the York City youth system in 1996, turning professional in 1998. He made his first-team debut in a 3–0 defeat to Preston North End on 8 August 1998. He finished the 1998–99 season with 44 appearances and one goal. He trained with Leeds United after the end of the season. He was sacked by York after experiencing personal problems and he was signed by Mansfield Town in 2000. He made his debut in a 1–0 defeat to Barnet and he finished the 1999–2000 season with six appearances for Mansfield. He went on to play for Irish club St Patrick's Athletic, where he made three appearances, before returning to England with Lincoln City in December. He made his debut in a 3–1 victory over Blackpool in the Football League Trophy on 9 January 2001. After making two further appearances for Lincoln he joined Football Conference club Hednesford Town on loan in March. He made his debut in a 4–2 defeat to Doncaster Rovers and he finished the loan spell with two appearances. He joined North Ferriby United in August 2002.

== Style of play ==
Described as a "skilful left sided player", he was able to play as a left midfielder and a left back. York manager Alan Little said of him: "He's like a steam train. He just keeps going. His ability to get about the park has been amazing".

== Personal life ==
As of April 2008, Garratt was under an anti-social behaviour order in Middlesbrough. Prior to his death, he had been diagnosed with schizophrenia.

== Death ==
Garratt died on 24 October 2014 in Middlesbrough. Police officers were called by ambulance service colleagues, to an address in Middlesbrough, on the evening of 24 October, to check on a man who had been taken seriously ill. The ambulance service subsequently reported that he had died. Following an investigation, officers deemed Garratt's death as not suspicious. Garratt's death was later determined as having been caused by effects of alcohol and prescribed drugs.
