= John Hawksby =

English footballer

Personal information
- Date of birth: 12 June 1942 (age 84)
- Place of birth: York, England
- Position: Winger

Senior career*
Years	Team	Apps	(Gls)
1960–1964	Leeds United	37	(2)
1964–1966	Lincoln City		
1966–1968	York City		

International career
1959	England Youth		
- * Club domestic league appearances and goals

John Hawksby is an English former professional footballer who played as a winger for Leeds United, Lincoln City, and York City in the 1960s.

== Club career ==
Born York, Yorkshire, Hawksby made his debut for Leeds United, aged 18, in August 1960 and scored in each of his first two games, which were to be the only two goals that he scored for Leeds. He played for Leeds during an unsettled period for the club, including the 1961–62 season in which Leeds battled against relegation to the Third Division. His place in the team was taken by Albert Johanneson for the 1962–63 season and he made only nine further first team appearances before joining Lincoln City in August 1964. He made 74 appearances scoring 5 goals.He then joined York City during the 1965–66 season.

== International career ==
Hawksby was capped by the England national youth team in 1959 while a Leeds player.
