= Marc Thompson (footballer) =

English footballer

Personal information
- Date of birth: 15 January 1982 (age 44)
- Place of birth: York, England
- Position: Midfielder

Team information
- Current team: Selby Town

Senior career*
Years	Team	Apps	(Gls)
1999–2002	York City	22	(0)
	Harrogate Town	7	(0)
2003–2004	Farnborough Town	20	(0)
2004–2006	Wakefield-Emley	48	(8)
2007–	Selby Town	0	(0)
- * Club domestic league appearances and goals as of 12:03, 27 July 2007 (UTC)

Marc Thompson (born 15 January 1982) is an English footballer, who played in the English Football League for York City between 2000 and 2002.

== Career ==
Thompson graduated through the youth side at York City and made his first-team debut in 2000. He was given a three-year pro-contract in May 2000, having shown promise through his first few games. He was awarded the Gerry Davitt Memorial Trophy for the 1999–2000 season. Boston United offered Thompson a trial in December 2001. Harrogate Town expressed an interest in signing Thompson in May 2002, and signed at the start of the 2002–03 season. He then signed for Farnborough Town in August 2003, but was released in February 2004.

Harrogate expressed an interest in re-signing Thompson in February 2004. Thompson was signed by Wakefield-Emley in October 2004.

Thompson was signed by Selby Town in July 2007. Thompson now plays for Haxby United in the York Leeper Hare Premier League along with former York City players Andy McMillan and Neale Holmes.
