= Tommy Maskill =

English footballer

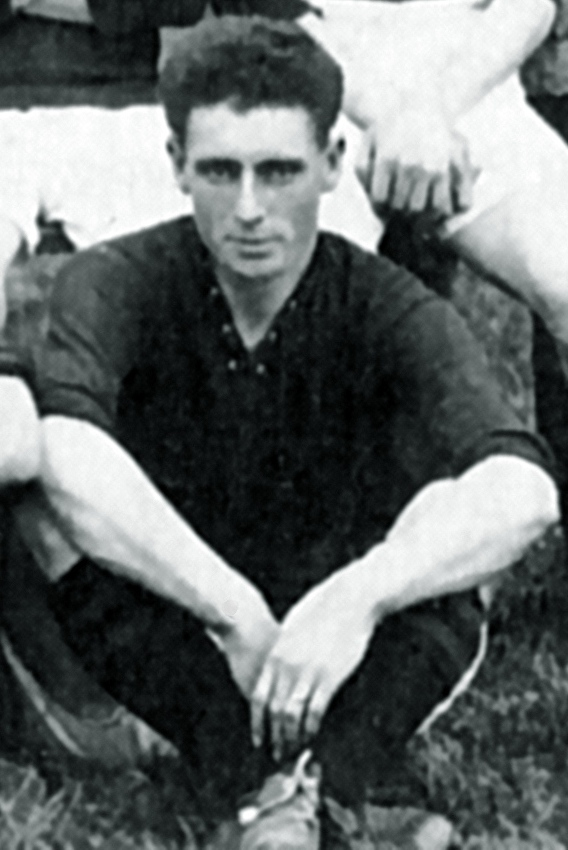
- Maskill with York City in 1922

Personal information
- Full name: Thomas Maskill
- Date of birth: 2 May 1903
- Place of birth: York, England
- Date of death: July 1956 (aged 53)
- Place of death: York, England
- Height: 5 ft 9 in (1.75 m)
- Positions: Full back; half-back

Senior career*
Years	Team	Apps	(Gls)
1920	Poppleton Road Old Boys		
1920–1922	Acomb WMC		
1922–1923	York City	41	(1)
1923–1926	Coventry City	59	(1)
1926–1927	Caernarvon Athletic		
1927–1928	Rhyl United		
1928–1929	Coventry City	10	(0)
1929–1930	Scarborough		
1930–1931	Carlisle United	37	(1)
1931–1932	Barnsley	17	(3)
1932–1933	York City	29	(3)
1933–1934	Selby Town		
Total		193	(9)
- * Club domestic league appearances and goals

Thomas Maskill (2 May 1903 – July 1956) was an English professional footballer who played as a full back and a half-back in the Football League for Coventry City, Carlisle United, Barnsley and York City, in non-League football for Poppleton Road Old Boys, Acomb WMC and Selby Town and in Welsh football for Caernarvon Athletic and Rhyl United. He was an England schoolboy international. After retiring he worked as a coach at Leeman Road United.
