= English Schools' Football Association =

Governing body for school football

- Abbreviation: ESFA
- Founded: 1904; 122 years ago
- Headquarters: 4, Parker Court; Staffordshire Technology Park
- Location: Stafford, Staffordshire
- Chairman: Phil Harding
- Chief Executive: Andrea Chilton
- Website: schoolsfootball.org

The English Schools' Football Association was founded in 1904 and is the governing body of schools' football in England. It is responsible for the running and development of schools competitions and festivals at primary and secondary school age. The ESFA headquarters is in Stafford.

The Football Association (FA) works with ESFA to support high quality, coordinated inter school football competition programmes for all young people. The association run national competitions from under-11 to under-19 age groups. This provides opportunities for young people to have the experience of playing at a higher level by representing their schools in a national recognised competition with all of the finals taking place at professional stadia. In the last few seasons, the ESFA has had finals at the Etihad Stadium, Old Trafford, Anfield, Stamford Bridge, Craven Cottage, Goodison Park, the Hawthorns and even Wembley Stadium.

The ESFA's centenary year was in 2004. England Schoolboys v Rest of World was played at Aston Villa F.C. to celebrate this. The game saw over 10,000 spectators attend.

== England Schoolboys and England Schoolgirls ==
The ESFA also co-ordinate the advancement of players all the way to International level, for England Schoolboys (Under 18) and England Schoolgirls (Under 15) teams. The process for representation follows this pattern; School teams nominate the best few players to go forward for County (or District) trials, from these a County team is formed. The County Schools' Associations will then nominate players to go forward to regional (North, Midlands, South West, South East) trials and from these players an International squad is selected.

The England Schoolboys represent their Country by playing in the Centenary Shield. Teams in the competition include England, Scotland, Wales, Northern Ireland and Republic of Ireland. The Boys also play in friendly matches and in the past they have faced New Zealand, Australia, France and Belgium.

The England Schoolgirls play in the Bob Docherty Cup and the Lloyds TSB Cup. Season 2011/12 was the first time this team was run to help with the development in Girls' Football.

== National Schools' Football Week ==
Schools' Football Week is a national campaign organised by the English Schools' Football Association encouraging schools' across England to engage in footballing activities. The week runs in the last week of February but had to be postponed until May in 2021 due to the Covid-19 Pandemic. The initiative was first introduced by the ESFA back in 2016 and has grown in stature and participation over the four years since its introduction. The Week includes an initiative called SFW GameOn! with the aim of getting as many school pupils as possible to play on one day creating the worlds biggest football match. Schools Football Week 2021 saw over 8000 schools register their activity and 105,000 school pupils actively involved in the initiative.

A highlight from Schools Football Week 2017 was Chris Kamara attending Lymm High School, running some coaching sessions with the pupils and answering the students questions.
