= List of York City F.C. seasons =

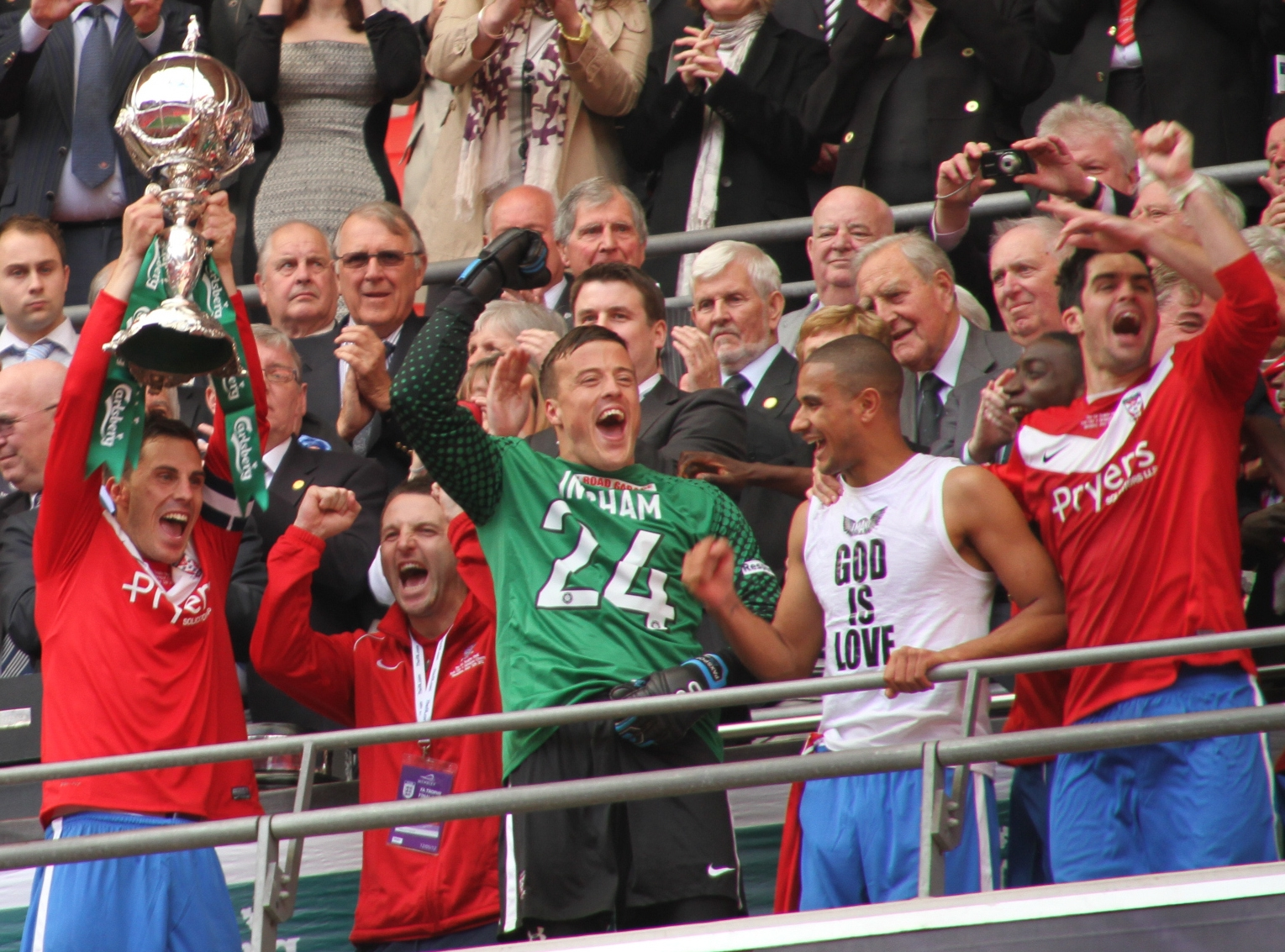
York City captain Chris Smith (far left) lifting the FA Trophy after the 2–0 win over Newport County at Wembley Stadium in the 2012 FA Trophy final

York City Football Club, a professional association football club based in York, North Yorkshire, England, was founded in 1922. They were elected to play in the Midland League for the 1922–23 season. After seven seasons in the Midland League, York were elected to play in the Football League in 1929 and were placed in the Third Division North. The team reached the semi-final of the 1954–55 FA Cup, and were defeated by eventual winners Newcastle United in a replay, which is the furthest the club have reached in the competition. York played in the Third Division North until the 1958–59 season, when they were placed in the Fourth Division on league reorganisation. They won the first promotion in their history this season, after finishing third in the Fourth Division.

York were promoted to the Second Division in 1974 and the 1974–75 season saw them achieve their highest league placing after finishing in 15th place. Two successive relegations and a finish of 22nd in the Fourth Division saw the club apply for re-election to the Football League at the end of the 1977–78 season. York won their first and only title after finishing first in the Fourth Division in the 1983–84 season with 101 points, becoming the first team to reach a three-figure points total in a Football League season. The club's first play-off success came in the 1992–93 season, against Crewe Alexandra in the final. After a 1–1 extra-time draw, York won 5–3 in a penalty shoot-out at Wembley Stadium to earn promotion to the Second Division. The following season saw York compete in the Second Division play-off semi-final, where they were beaten 1–0 on aggregate by Stockport County.

York were relegated to the Conference National after finishing bottom of the Third Division in the 2003–04 season, ending 75 years of Football League membership. The team reached the 2009 FA Trophy final in 2008–09, which was played at the new Wembley Stadium, where York were beaten 2–0 by Stevenage Borough. The 2011–12 season concluded with two victories at Wembley; after Newport County were defeated 2–0 in the 2012 FA Trophy final, York's Football League status was restored with a 2–1 victory over Luton Town in the 2012 Conference Premier play-off final. The club endured successive relegations from League Two to the National League North in the 2015–16 and 2016–17 seasons, but finished the latter with a 3–2 win over Macclesfield Town at Wembley in the 2017 FA Trophy final. York spent five years in the National League North, being promoted to the National League via the play-offs in the 2021–22 season. York returned to the Football League after a ten-year absence by winning the 2025–26 National League with 108 points—the highest seasonal points tally in the club's history.

As at the end of 2025–26, the club's first team had spent 2 seasons in the second tier of English football, 38 in the third, 32 in the fourth, and 24 in non-League football. The table details their achievements in first-team competitions, and records their top goalscorer and average home league attendance, for each completed season since their first in 1922–23.

== Key ==
Key to league record:

- P – Matches played
- W – Matches won
- D – Matches drawn
- L – Matches lost
- F – Goals for
- A – Goals against
- Pts – Points
- Pos – Final position

Key to colours and symbols:

1st or W	Winners
2nd or F	Runners-up
↑	Promoted
↓	Relegated
♦	Top league scorer in York's division

Key to divisions:

- Midland – Midland League
- Division 2 – Football League Second Division
- Division 3 – Football League Third Division
- Division 3N – Football League Third Division North
- Division 4 – Football League Fourth Division
- Conference – Conference National/Premier
- League 2 – Football League Two
- National – National League
- National N – National League North

Key to rounds:

- Group(N) – Group stage Northern section
- QR1 – First qualifying round, etc.
- R1 – First round, etc.
- R1(N) – First round Northern section, etc.
- QF – Quarter-final
- QF(N) – Quarter-final Northern section
- SF – Semi-final
- SF(N) – Semi-final Northern section
- RU – Runners-up
- W – Winners
- DNE – Did not enter

Details of abandoned competitions are shown in italics and appropriately footnoted.

== Seasons ==
List of seasons, including league division and statistics, cup results, top scorer and average league attendance
Season	League									FA Cup	League Cup (Note: The Football League Cup competition started in the 1960–61 season.)	Other		Top scorer(s) (Note: Includes goals scored in the Midland League, the Football League (including play-offs), Football Conference/National League (including play-offs), FA Cup, Football League Third Division North Cup, Football League Cup, Associate Members' Cup/Football League Trophy, FA Trophy and Conference Cup/Conference League Cup. Sources: 1922–23 to 2007–08, 2008–09, 2009–10, 2010–11, 2011–12, 2012–13 to 2015–16, 2016–17, 2017–18, 2018–19, 2019–20, 2020–21, 2021–22, 2022–23, 2023–24, 2024–25, and 2025–26.)		Average (Note: League matches only (including Football League and Football Conference/National League, but excluding play-offs). Sources: 1929–30 to 2007–08, 2008–09, 2009–10, 2010–11 to 2015–16, 2016–17, 2017–18 to 2019–20, 2020–21, 2021–22 to 2022–23, 2023–24, 2024–25, and 2025–26.) attendance
Season	Division (Note: Divisions are sorted according to their level within the English football league system at the time.)	P	W	D	L	F	A	Pts	Pos	FA Cup	League Cup	Competition	Result	Player(s)	Goals	Average attendance
1922–23	Midland (Note: York were elected to the Midland League for the 1922–23 season.)	42	11	12	19	56	70	34	19th	DNE (Note: York did not enter the FA Cup in the 1922–23 season as the club was formed too late to apply.)	—	—	—	Charles Elliott	16	—
1923–24	Midland	42	10	13	19	48	71	33	19th	QR1	—	—	—	Arthur Charlesworth	12	—
1924–25	Midland (Note: After eight reserve teams withdrew from the Midland League in the summer of 1924 to form the Midland Combination, two competitions were formed to ensure a full set of fixtures. The first competition concluded in February 1925 with 28 fixtures having been played, and the second was organised into subsidiary North and South sections. York competed in the North section, finishing with the following record: P 14 W 7 D 3 L 4 F 21 A 18 Pts 17 Pos 2nd.)	28	10	10	8	39	36	30	6th	QR1	—	—	—	James Miller	20	—
1925–26	Midland	40	14	7	19	74	94	35	16th	QR3	—	—	—	R. Holland	17	—
1926–27	Midland	38	16	13	9	96	68	45	6th	R2	—	—	—	Charlie Flood	19	—
1927–28	Midland	44	22	7	15	97	73	51	7th	QR4	—	—	—	John Hammerton	21	—
1928–29	Midland	50	22	13	15	106	99	57	9th	R1	—	—	—	Jimmy Cowie	56	—
1929–30	Division 3N (Note: York were elected to the Football League Third Division North for the 1929–30 season.)	42	15	16	11	77	64	46	6th	R3	—	—	—	Billy Bottrill; Tom Fenoughty	20	5,279
1930–31	Division 3N	42	18	6	18	85	82	42	12th	R3	—	—	—	Tom Fenoughty	17	3,906
1931–32	Division 3N	40	18	7	15	76	81	43	9th	R1	—	—	—	Reg Baines	29	4,330
1932–33	Division 3N	42	13	6	23	72	92	32	20th	R1	—	—	—	Reg Baines	29	4,370
1933–34	Division 3N	42	15	8	19	71	74	38	12th	R1	—	Football League Third Division North Cup	R3	Maurice Dando	29	4,361
1934–35	Division 3N	42	15	6	21	76	82	36	15th	R3	—	Football League Third Division North Cup	R2	Maurice Dando	23	3,902
1935–36	Division 3N	42	13	12	17	62	95	38	16th	R1	—	Football League Third Division North Cup	R1	Fred Speed	14	3,721
1936–37	Division 3N	42	16	11	15	79	70	43	12th	R4	—	Football League Third Division North Cup	R3	Albert Thompson	29	5,257
1937–38	Division 3N	42	16	10	16	70	68	42	11th	QF	—	Football League Third Division North Cup	R1	Reg Baines	28	5,957
1938–39	Division 3N	42	12	8	22	64	92	32	20th	R3	—	—	—	Bob Mortimer	22	5,544
1939–40	Division 3N	3	0	1	2	3	5	1	20th (Note: When the Second World War began, the 1939–40 Football League season was abandoned with three matches played.)	—	—	—	—	Billy Allen	2	6,000 (Note: York played one league match at home before the 1939–40 season was abandoned, which was played in front of a crowd of 6,000.)
1939–45	The Football League and FA Cup were suspended until after the Second World War. (Note: The club played 239 competitive matches in regional league and cup football between 1939 and 1946. Guest players were permitted, and results and records from this period are not included in official statistics.)															
1945–46	—	—	—	—	—	—	—	—	—	R4 (Note: From the first round to the sixth round of the 1945–46 FA Cup, matches were played over two legs.)	—	—	—	Ian Winters	4	—
1946–47	Division 3N	42	14	9	19	67	81	37	15th	R1	—	—	—	Alf Patrick	17	6,900
1947–48	Division 3N	42	13	14	15	65	60	40	13th	R1	—	—	—	Alf Patrick	19	9,006
1948–49	Division 3N	42	15	9	18	74	74	39	14th	R2	—	—	—	Alf Patrick	27	10,412
1949–50	Division 3N	42	9	13	20	52	70	31	22nd	R1	—	—	—	Alf Patrick	14	8,016
1950–51	Division 3N	46	12	15	19	66	77	39	17th	R3	—	—	—	Matt Patrick	14	7,478
1951–52	Division 3N	46	18	13	15	73	52	49	10th	R1	—	—	—	Billy Fenton	31	7,968
1952–53	Division 3N	46	20	13	13	60	45	53	4th	R1	—	—	—	Billy Fenton	25	8,654
1953–54	Division 3N	46	12	13	21	64	86	37	22nd	R1	—	—	—	Dave Dunmore	21	5,636
1954–55	Division 3N	46	24	10	12	92	63	58	4th	SF	—	—	—	Arthur Bottom (Note: Scored 31 goals in the Third Division North.)	39 ♦	9,630
1955–56	Division 3N	46	19	9	18	85	72	47	11th	R4	—	—	—	Arthur Bottom	33	10,291
1956–57	Division 3N	46	21	10	15	75	61	52	7th	R2	—	—	—	Arthur Bottom	22	9,414
1957–58	Division 3N	46	17	12	17	68	76	46	13th	R4	—	—	—	Terry Farmer; Norman Wilkinson; Peter Wragg	12	7,270
1958–59	Division 4 (Note: York were placed in the Football League Fourth Division on League reorganisation.) ↑	46	21	18	7	73	52	60	3rd	R1	—	—	—	Peter Wragg	14	8,124
1959–60	Division 3 ↓	46	13	12	21	57	73	38	21st	R3	—	—	—	Johnny Edgar	17	7,507
1960–61	Division 4	46	21	9	16	80	60	51	5th	R3	R1	—	—	Peter Wragg	22	6,900
1961–62	Division 4	44	20	10	14	84	53	50	6th	R1	QF	—	—	Jimmy Weir	29	6,890
1962–63	Division 4	46	16	11	19	67	62	43	14th	R3	R1	—	—	Norman Wilkinson	17	4,515
1963–64	Division 4	46	14	7	25	52	66	35	22nd	R1	R2	—	—	Norman Wilkinson	12	3,937
1964–65	Division 4 ↑	46	28	6	12	91	56	62	3rd	R2	R1	—	—	Paul Aimson	30	7,185
1965–66	Division 3 ↓	46	9	9	28	53	106	27	24th	R1	R2	—	—	Paul Aimson	21	5,921
1966–67	Division 4	46	12	11	23	65	69	35	22nd	R2	R3	—	—	Tommy Spencer	23	3,776
1967–68	Division 4	46	11	14	21	65	68	36	21st	R1	R1	—	—	Ted MacDougall	15	4,578
1968–69	Division 4	46	14	11	21	53	75	39	21st	R3	R1	—	—	Ted MacDougall	25	3,883
1969–70	Division 4	46	16	14	16	55	62	46	13th	R4	R1	—	—	Phil Boyer	12	3,951
1970–71	Division 4 ↑	46	23	10	13	78	54	56	4th	R4	R2	—	—	Paul Aimson	31	4,962
1971–72	Division 3	46	12	12	22	57	66	36	19th	R2	R3	—	—	Paul Aimson	16	5,597
1972–73	Division 3	46	13	15	18	42	46	41	18th	R3	R1	—	—	Eddie Rowles	9	3,792
1973–74	Division 3 ↑	46	21	19	6	67	38	61	3rd	R1	R4	—	—	Chris Jones	20	6,600
1974–75	Division 2	42	14	10	18	51	55	38	15th	R3	R1	—	—	Jimmy Seal	18	8,828
1975–76	Division 2 ↓	42	10	8	24	39	71	28	21st	R4	R2	—	—	Micky Cave; Jimmy Seal	8	5,189
1976–77	Division 3 ↓	46	10	12	24	50	89	32	24th	R2	R1	—	—	Brian Pollard	13	2,986
1977–78	Division 4	46	12	12	22	50	69	36	22nd	R1	R1	—	—	Gordon Staniforth	13	2,139
1978–79	Division 4	46	18	11	17	51	55	47	10th	R4	R1	—	—	Gordon Staniforth	19	2,935
1979–80	Division 4	46	14	11	21	65	82	39	17th	R2	R1	—	—	Terry Eccles	10	2,703
1980–81	Division 4	46	12	9	25	47	66	33	24th	R1	R2	—	—	Ian McDonald	12	2,162
1981–82	Division 4	46	14	8	24	69	91	50 (Note: The 1981–82 season saw the introduction of three points for a win instead of two.)	17th	R2	R1	—	—	Keith Walwyn	25	2,362
1982–83	Division 4	46	22	13	11	88	58	79	7th	R3	R1	—	—	Keith Walwyn	24	3,243
1983–84	Division 4 ↑	46	31	8	7	96	39	101	1st	R2	R1	Associate Members' Cup	R1(N)	John Byrne	28	5,008
1984–85	Division 3	46	20	9	17	70	57	69	8th	R5	R2	Associate Members' Cup	QF(N)	Keith Houchen	18	5,550
1985–86	Division 3	46	20	11	15	77	58	71	7th	R5	R2	Associate Members' Cup	Group(N)	Keith Walwyn	29	4,111
1986–87	Division 3	46	12	13	21	55	79	49	20th	R2	R2	Associate Members' Cup	R1(N)	Keith Walwyn	25	3,432
1987–88	Division 3 ↓	46	8	9	29	48	91	33	23rd	R2	R2	Associate Members' Cup	Group(N)	Dale Banton	18	2,754
1988–89	Division 4	46	17	13	16	62	63	64	11th	R1	R1	Associate Members' Cup	R1(N)	Ian Helliwell	11	2,613
1989–90	Division 4	46	16	16	14	55	53	64	13th	R1	R2	Associate Members' Cup	R1(N)	Ian Helliwell	19	2,615
1990–91	Division 4	46	11	13	22	45	57	46	21st	R2	R1	Associate Members' Cup	R1(N)	Ian Helliwell	10	2,511
1991–92	Division 4	42	8	16	18	42	58	40	19th	R2	R1	Associate Members' Cup	Group(N)	Ian Blackstone	11	2,506
1992–93	Division 3 (Note: The Fourth Division was renamed Division Three after the Premier League broke away from the Football League.) ↑	42	21	12	9	72	45	75	4th (Note: Promoted to the Football League Second Division via the play-offs, beating Bury 1–0 on aggregate in the semi-final and Crewe Alexandra 5–3 in a penalty shoot-out in the final after the match had finished 1–1 after extra time.)	R1	R1	Football League Trophy	Group(N)	Paul Barnes	21	3,946
1993–94	Division 2	42	21	12	13	64	40	75	5th (Note: Lost 1–0 on aggregate to Stockport County in the play-off semi-final.)	R1	R1	Football League Trophy	R1(N)	Paul Barnes	25	4,633
1994–95	Division 2	46	21	9	16	67	51	72	9th	R1	R1	Football League Trophy	Group(N)	Paul Barnes	17	3,685
1995–96	Division 2	46	13	13	20	58	73	52	20th	R1	R3	Football League Trophy	SF(N)	Paul Barnes	22	3,538
1996–97	Division 2	46	13	13	20	47	68	52	20th	R3	R3	Football League Trophy	QF(N)	Neil Tolson	17	3,359
1997–98	Division 2	46	14	17	15	52	58	59	16th	R2	R2	Football League Trophy	R2(N)	Rodney Rowe	16	3,850
1998–99	Division 2 ↓	46	13	11	22	56	80	50	21st	R2	R1	Football League Trophy	R2(N)	Richard Cresswell	19	3,645
1999–2000	Division 3	46	12	16	18	39	53	52	20th	R1	R1	Football League Trophy	R1(N)	Barry Conlon	11	3,048
2000–01	Division 3	46	13	13	20	42	63	52	17th	R3	R1	Football League Trophy	R1(N)	David McNiven	10	3,026
2001–02	Division 3	46	16	9	21	54	67	57	14th	R4	R1	Football League Trophy	R1(N)	Michael Proctor	14	3,144
2002–03	Division 3	46	17	15	14	52	53	66	10th	R2	R1	Football League Trophy	R1(N)	Peter Duffield	15	4,176
2003–04	Division 3 ↓	46	10	14	22	35	66	44	24th	R1	R1	Football League Trophy	R1(N)	Lee Nogan	9	3,963
2004–05	Conference	42	11	10	21	39	66	43	17th	QR4	—	Football League Trophy FA Trophy Conference Cup	R1(N) R3 R3(N)	Andy Bishop	12	2,333
2005–06	Conference	42	17	12	13	63	48	63	8th	R1	—	FA Trophy	R1	Andy Bishop (Note: Scored 22 goals in the Conference National.)	25 ♦	2,871
2006–07	Conference	46	23	11	12	65	45	80	4th (Note: Lost 2–1 on aggregate to Morecambe in the play-off semi-final.)	R1	—	FA Trophy	R1	Clayton Donaldson	26	2,859
2007–08	Conference	46	17	11	18	71	74	62	14th	R1	—	FA Trophy Conference League Cup	SF R5(N)	Onome Sodje; Martyn Woolford	17	2,258
2008–09	Conference	46	11	19	16	47	51	52	17th	QR4	—	Conference League Cup FA Trophy	R4(N) RU (Note: York's first appearance in the final of a knockout cup competition, which was a 2–0 defeat to Stevenage Borough.)	Richard Brodie	19	2,295
2009–10	Conference	44 (Note: Following Chester City's expulsion from the Football Conference, their results were expunged, meaning the league season was reduced from 46 matches to 44.)	22	12	10	62	35	78	5th (Note: Beat Luton Town 2–0 on aggregate in the semi-final before losing 3–1 to Oxford United in the final.)	R3	—	FA Trophy	QF	Richard Brodie (Note: Scored 26 goals in the Conference Premier.)	34 ♦	2,664
2010–11	Conference	46	19	14	13	55	50	71	8th	R3	—	FA Trophy	R1	Michael Rankine	14	2,485
2011–12	Conference ↑	46	23	14	9	81	45	83	4th (Note: Promoted to Football League Two via the play-offs, beating Mansfield Town 2–1 on aggregate in the semi-final and Luton Town 2–1 in the final.)	QR4	—	FA Trophy	W (Note: Beat Newport County 2–0 in the 2012 FA Trophy final to win the club's first major trophy.)	Matty Blair	20	3,117
2012–13	League 2	46	12	19	15	50	60	55	17th	R1	R1	Football League Trophy	R2(N)	Ashley Chambers	10	3,879
2013–14	League 2	46	18	17	11	52	41	71	7th (Note: Lost 1–0 on aggregate to Fleetwood Town in the play-off semi-final.)	R1	R1	Football League Trophy	R2(N)	Wes Fletcher	13	3,773
2014–15	League 2	46	11	19	16	46	51	52	18th	R1	R1	Football League Trophy	R1(N)	Jake Hyde	10	3,555
2015–16	League 2 ↓	46	7	13	26	51	87	34	24th	R1	R2	Football League Trophy	QF(N)	Vadaine Oliver	10	3,218
2016–17	National ↓	46	11	17	18	55	70	50	21st	QR4	—	FA Trophy	W	Jon Parkin	16	2,570
2017–18	National N	42	16	10	16	65	62	58	11th	QR3	—	FA Trophy	R1	Jon Parkin	25	2,755
2018–19	National N	42	16	10	16	58	63	58	12th	R1	—	FA Trophy	R1	Jordan Burrow	19	2,501
2019–20	National N	34	19	9	6	52	28	66	2nd (Note: The 2019–20 season was disrupted by the effects of the COVID-19 pandemic. The National League was suspended in mid-March 2020 and the clubs voted six weeks later to end the regular season programme. Teams had not all played the same number of matches, so it was agreed to construct final league tables on an unweighted points per game basis. York's 81.529 points per game placed them second and meant they qualified for the play-offs, in which they were beaten 2–0 by Altrincham in the semi-final.)	R1	—	FA Trophy	QR3	Jordan Burrow	15	2,705
2020–21	National N	13	6	4	3	22	17	22	8th (Note: After the 2020–21 season was disrupted by COVID-19 pandemic-related issues, including matches being played behind closed doors, testing requirements, and a perceived lack of adequate government support, the National League clubs voted on whether to continue their season. As a result, the National Leagues North and South were declared null and void in February 2021, at which point the northern clubs had played between 11 and 18 matches.)	QR3	—	FA Trophy	R2	Sean Newton	8	514 (Note: Because of COVID-19 restrictions, the first five of York's seven home league matches in the 2020–21 season were played behind closed doors. The last two were played in front of COVID-restricted capacity crowds of 400 and 627.)
2021–22	National N ↑	42	19	9	14	58	50	66	5th (Note: Promoted to the National League via the play-offs, beating Chorley 2–1 in the eliminator, Brackley Town 1–0 in the semi-final, and Boston United 2–0 in the final.)	R1	—	FA Trophy	SF	Clayton Donaldson	14	3,116
2022–23	National	46	13	12	21	55	63	51	19th	R1	—	FA Trophy	QF	Lenell John-Lewis	17	4,827
2023–24	National	46	12	17	17	55	69	53	20th	R2	—	FA Trophy	R3	Dipo Akinyemi	15	4,854
2024–25	National	46	29	9	8	95	42	96	2nd (Note: Lost 3–0 to Oldham Athletic in the play-off semi-final.)	R1	—	FA Trophy	R4	Ollie Pearce (Note: Scored 31 goals in the National League.)	33 ♦	6,051
2025–26	National ↑	46	33	9	4	114	41	108	1st	R1	—	FA Trophy	R3	Ollie Pearce (Note: Scored 34 goals in the National League.)	35 ♦	6,657
