= List of York City F.C. records and statistics =

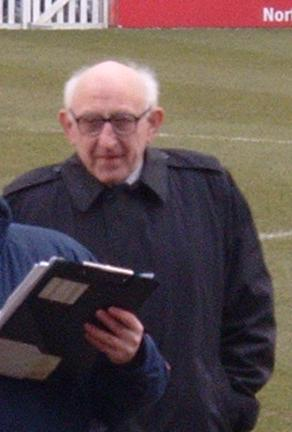
Norman Wilkinson, York City's top goalscorer with 143 goals in all competitions

York City Football Club is a professional association football club based in York, North Yorkshire, England. The club was founded in 1922 and was elected to the Midland League, which the team played in until 1929 when they were elected to the Football League. The highest level of the English football league system the team has reached is the second tier, spending two seasons in the Second Division during the 1970s. The club lost its Football League status following relegation to the Football Conference in 2004, but regained it eight years later with victory in the 2012 Conference Premier play-off final.

This list encompasses the major honours won by York City, and records set by the club, its managers and its players. The player records section itemises the club's leading goalscorers and those who have made most appearances in first-team competitions. It also records notable achievements by York players on the international stage, and the highest transfer fees paid and received by the club. Attendance records at Fulfordgate, Bootham Crescent and the York Community Stadium are also included.

All figures are correct as of the match played on 26 September 2026.

== Honours ==
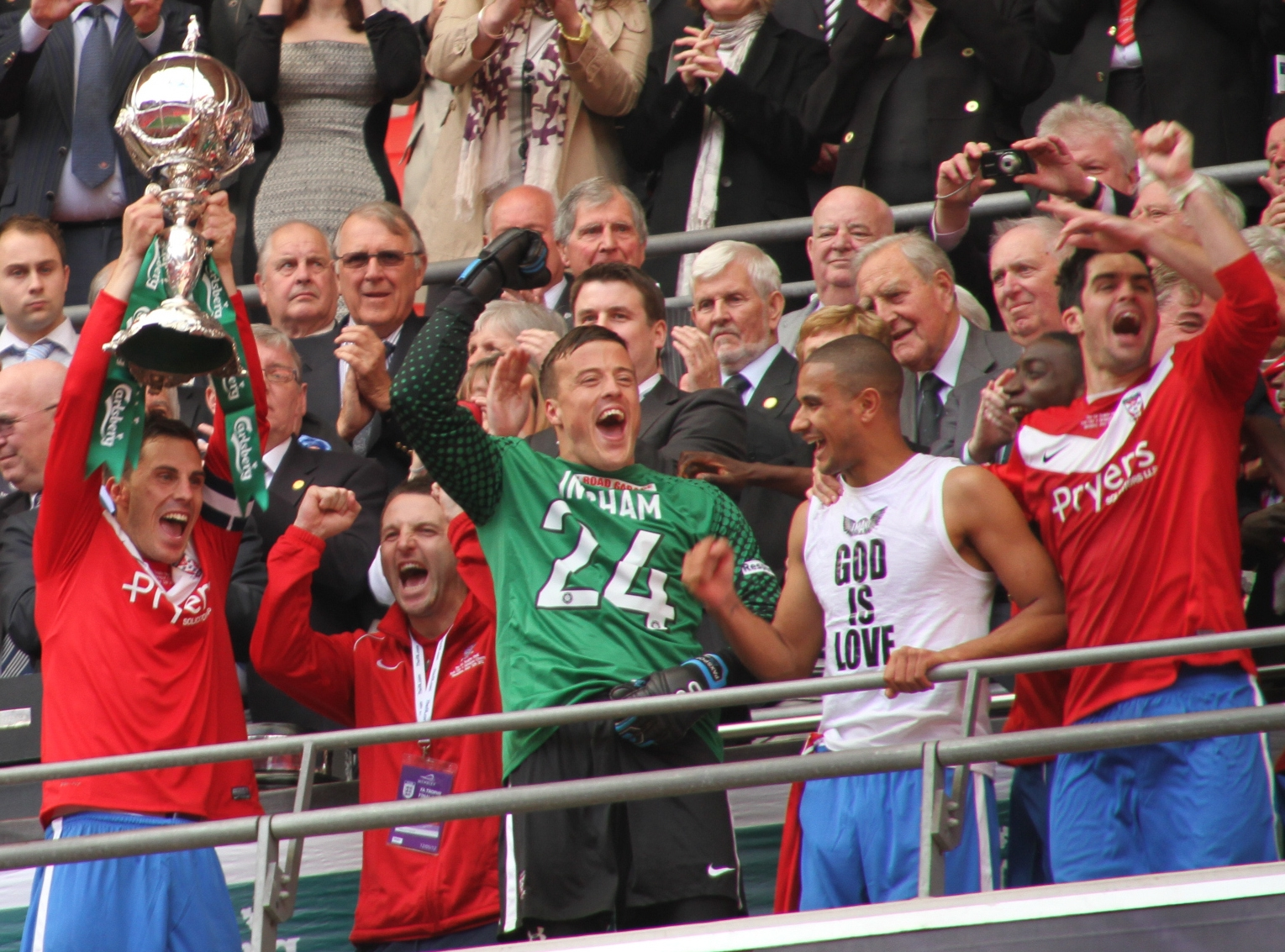
York players after the club's victory in the 2012 FA Trophy final

York City have won one major honour in the Football League, when winning the 1983–84 Fourth Division championship. With 101 points, York became the first club in the Football League to reach a three-figure points total. They have achieved promotion on eight other occasions, most recently in the 2025–26 season, when winning the National League title. York won their first domestic cup competition in the 2011–12 season, beating Newport County in the 2012 FA Trophy final.

York's honours and achievements include the following:

League competition

- Third Division (level 3)
  - Promotion: 1973–74 (Note: Promoted automatically to the Second Division by finishing in third place in the Third Division.)
- Fourth Division / Third Division (level 4)
  - Champions: 1983–84
  - Promotion: 1958–59, (Note: Promoted automatically to the Third Division by finishing in third place in the Fourth Division.) 1964–65, 1970–71, (Note: Promoted automatically to the Third Division by finishing in fourth place in the Fourth Division.) 1992–93 (Note: Promoted via the play-offs to the Second Division after finishing in fourth place in the Third Division.)
- Conference Premier / National League (level 5)
  - Champions: 2025–26
  - Promotion: 2011–12 (Note: Promoted via the play-offs to League Two after finishing in fourth place in the Conference Premier.)
- National League North (level 6)
  - Promotion: 2021–22 (Note: Promoted via the play-offs to the National League after finishing in fifth place in the National League North.)

Domestic cup competition

- FA Trophy
  - Winners: 2011–12, 2016–17
  - Finalists: 2008–09

== Club records ==
=== Season records ===
- Most league wins in a season: 33 in 46 matches, National League, 2025–26.
- Fewest league wins in a season: 7 in 46 matches, League Two, 2015–16.
- Most league draws in a season:
  - 19 in 46 matches, Third Division, 1973–74.
  - 19 in 46 matches, Conference Premier, 2008–09.
  - 19 in 46 matches, League Two, 2012–13.
  - 19 in 46 matches, League Two, 2014–15.
- Fewest league draws in a season:
  - 6 in 42 matches: Third Division North, 1930–31.
  - 6 in 42 matches: Third Division North, 1932–33.
  - 6 in 42 matches: Third Division North, 1934–35.
  - 6 in 46 matches: Fourth Division, 1964–65.
- Most league defeats in a season: 29 in 46 matches, Third Division, 1987–88.
- Fewest league defeats in a season: 4 in 46 matches, National League, 2025–26.

=== Points ===
- Most points in a season:
  - Two points for a win: 62 in 46 matches, Fourth Division, 1964–65.
  - Three points for a win: 108 in 46 matches, National League, 2025–26.
- Fewest points in a season:
  - Two points for a win: 27 in 46 matches, Third Division, 1965–66.
  - Three points for a win: 33 in 46 matches, Third Division, 1987–88.

=== Goals ===
- Most league goals scored in a season: 114 in 46 matches, National League, 2025–26.
- Fewest league goals scored in a season: 35 in 46 matches, Third Division, 2003–04.
- Most league goals conceded in a season: 106 in 46 matches, Third Division, 1965–66.
- Fewest league goals conceded in a season: 35 in 44 matches, Conference Premier, 2009–10.

=== Matches ===
==== Firsts ====
- First Midland League match: Notts County Reserves 4–2 York City, 6 September 1922.
- First match at Fulfordgate: York City 4–1 Mansfield Town, Midland League, 20 September 1922.
- First FA Cup match: York City 2–1 Castleford & Allerton United, extra preliminary round, 8 September 1923.
- First Football League match: Wigan Borough 0–2 York City, Third Division North, 31 August 1929.
- First match at Bootham Crescent: York City 2–2 Stockport County, Third Division North, 31 August 1932.
- First Third Division North Cup match: York City 2–1 Hartlepools United, first round, 13 January 1934.
- First League Cup match: York City 1–2 Blackburn Rovers, first round, 10 October 1960.
- First Associate Members' Cup/Football League Trophy match: York City 1–2 Hull City, first round north, 21 February 1984.
- First Football Conference/National League match: Aldershot Town 2–0 York City, 14 August 2004.
- First FA Trophy match: Burton Albion 3–0 York City, third round, 15 January 2005.
- First Conference Cup/Conference League Cup match: Accrington Stanley 2–1 York City, third round north, 25 January 2005.
- First match at York Community Stadium: York City 1–3 AFC Fylde, National League North, 16 February 2021.

==== Record wins ====
- Record league win: York City 9–1 Southport, Third Division North, 2 February 1957.
- Record FA Cup win:
  - York City 7–1 Horsforth, preliminary round, 20 September 1924.
  - York City 7–1 Stockton Malleable, third qualifying round, 29 October 1927.
  - York City 7–1 Stockton, first qualifying round, 29 September 1928.
  - South Shields 0–6 York City, first round, 16 November 1968.
  - York City 6–0 Rushall Olympic, fourth qualifying round, 27 October 2007.
- Record League Cup win: York City 5–0 Doncaster Rovers, first round second leg, 4 September 1984.

==== Record defeats ====
- Record league defeat: Chester 12–0 York City, Third Division North, 1 February 1936.
- Record FA Cup defeat: Liverpool 7–0 York City, fifth round replay, 20 February 1985.
- Record League Cup defeat: York City 1–5 Stoke City, first round first leg, 22 August 2000.

=== Record consecutive results ===
This section applies to league matches only.

- Record consecutive wins: 9, from 21 January 2026 to 28 February 2026, National League.
- Record consecutive draws:
  - 6, from 26 December 1992 to 22 January 1993, Third Division.
  - 6, from 3 May 2014 to 30 August 2014, League Two.
- Record consecutive defeats: 8, from 14 November 1966 to 31 December 1966, Fourth Division.
- Record consecutive matches without a defeat: 24, from 4 October 2025 to 28 February 2026, National League.
- Record consecutive matches without a draw: 22, from 11 January 1969 to 2 May 1969, Fourth Division.
- Record consecutive matches without a win: 21, 17 January 2004 to 14 August 2004, Third Division and Conference National.

=== Attendances ===
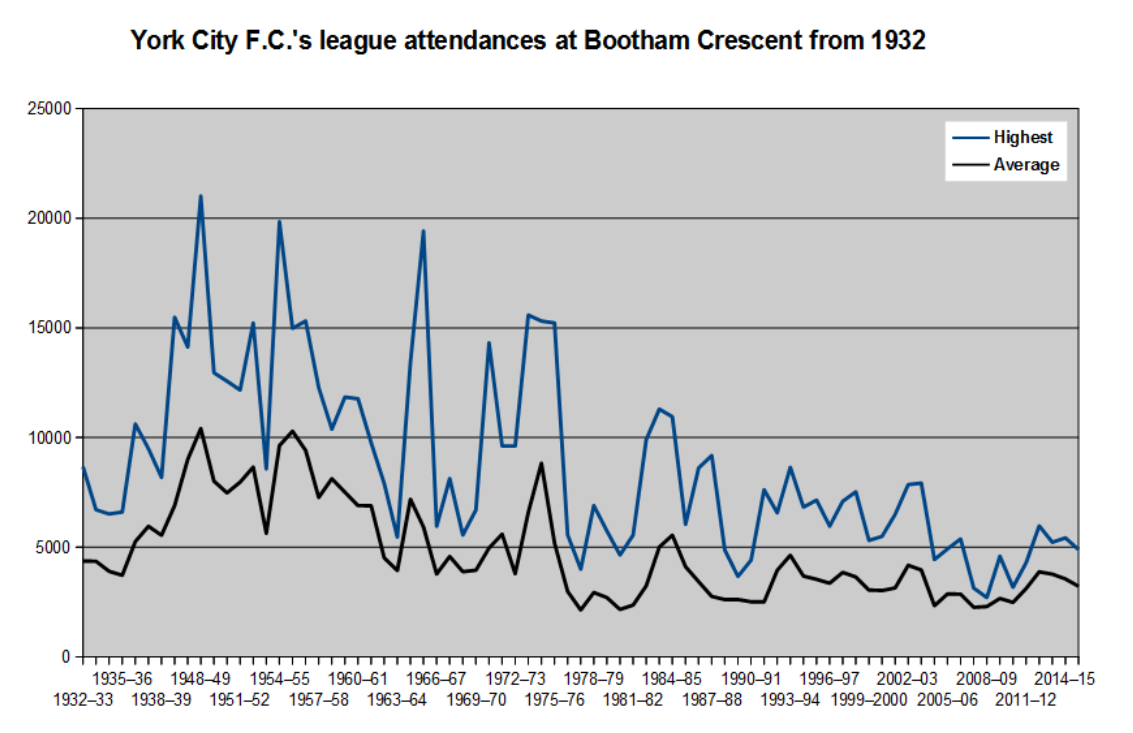
York's highest and average league attendances at Bootham Crescent from the 1932–33 season to the 2015–16 season

- Highest attendance at a home match:
  - Fulfordgate: 12,721, against Sheffield United, FA Cup third round replay, 14 January 1931.
  - Bootham Crescent: 28,123, against Huddersfield Town, FA Cup sixth round, 5 March 1938.
  - York Community Stadium: 8,268, against Gillingham, League Two, 26 September 2026.
- Lowest attendance at a home match:
  - Fulfordgate: 1,500, against Maltby Main, FA Cup preliminary round, 23 September 1925.
  - Bootham Crescent: 608, against Mansfield Town, Conference League Cup third round, 4 November 2008.
  - York Community Stadium: 1,184, against Blyth Spartans, FA Trophy second round, 27 November 2021.
- Highest seasonal average league attendance: 10,412, Third Division North, 1948–49.
- Lowest seasonal average league attendance: 2,139, Fourth Division, 1977–78.

== Managerial records ==
- First manager: Jock Collier managed the club for two seasons, which included 105 matches, from July 1928 to May 1930.
- Longest serving manager by time: Tom Mitchell managed the club for 12 years and 11 months, which included 270 matches, from March 1937 to February 1950.
- Longest serving manager by matches: Tom Lockie managed the club for 376 matches over a period of seven years and three months, from July 1960 to October 1967.

== Player records ==
=== Appearances ===
- Youngest first-team player: Reg Stockill, 15 years 281 days (against Wigan Borough, Third Division North, 29 August 1929).
- Oldest first-team player: Paul Musselwhite, 43 years 127 days (against Forest Green Rovers, Conference Premier, 28 April 2012).

==== Most appearances ====
Competitive matches only, appearances as substitute in brackets.

Appearances made, broken down by competition and whether starter or substitute
No.	Name	Years	League (Note: Includes Midland League, Football League, Football Conference/National League)	FA Cup	League Cup	Other (Note: Includes Third Division North Cup, Associate Members' Cup/Football League Trophy, Football League play-offs, FA Trophy, Conference Cup/Conference League Cup, Football Conference/National League play-offs)	Total
1	Barry Jackson	1958–1970	481 (1)	34 (0)	23 (0)	0 (0)	538 (1)
2	Andy McMillan	1987–1999	409 (12)	18 (0)	27 (0)	26 (0)	480 (12)
3	Chris Topping	1968–1978	410 (2)	26 (0)	25 (0)	0 (0)	461 (2)
4	Wayne Hall	1989–2001	353 (20)	13 (2)	27 (1)	21 (1)	414 (24)
5	Gary Ford	1978–1987	359 (7)	36 (0)	24 (0)	9 (0)	428 (7)
6	Tommy Forgan	1954–1966	388 (0)	30 (0)	10 (0)	0 (0)	428 (0)
7	Tony Canham	1985–1995	309 (38)	20 (0)	18 (0)	24 (4)	371 (42)
8	Norman Wilkinson	1954–1966	354 (0)	39 (0)	8 (0)	0 (0)	401 (0)
9	Phil Burrows	1966–1974	333 (4)	31 (0)	22 (0)	0 (0)	386 (4)
10	Daniel Parslow	2006–2013; 2017–2019	295 (23)	16 (1)	1 (0)	42 (4)	354 (28)

=== Goalscorers ===
- Most goals in a season: 56, by Jimmy Cowie in 1928–29.
- Most league goals in a season: 49, by Jimmy Cowie in the Midland League, 1928–29.
- Most goals in a match:
  - 6, by Jimmy Cowie against Stockton, FA Cup, 29 September 1928.
  - 6, by Jimmy Cowie against Worksop Town, Midland League, 23 February 1929.

==== Top goalscorers ====
Competitive matches only. Matches played (including as substitute) appear in brackets.

Goals scored and appearances made, broken down by competition
No.	Name	Years	League (Note: Includes Midland League, Football League, Football Conference/National League)	FA Cup	League Cup	Other (Note: Includes Third Division North Cup, Associate Members' Cup/Football League Trophy, Football League play-offs, FA Trophy, Conference Cup/Conference League Cup, Football Conference/National League play-offs)	Total
1	Norman Wilkinson	1954–1966	127 (354)	16 (39)	0 (8)	0 (0)	143 (401)
2	Keith Walwyn	1981–1987	119 (245)	11 (24)	9 (18)	1 (4)	140 (291)
3	Billy Fenton	1951–1958	118 (257)	6 (21)	0 (0)	0 (0)	124 (278)
4	Alf Patrick	1946–1953	109 (228)	8 (13)	0 (0)	0 (0)	117 (241)
5	Paul Aimson	1964–1966; 1969–1973	98 (219)	12 (19)	3 (10)	0 (0)	113 (248)
6	Arthur Bottom	1954–1958	92 (137)	13 (21)	0 (0)	0 (0)	105 (158)
7	Tom Fenoughty	1927–1934	97 (229)	7 (23)	0 (0)	0 (0)	104 (252)
8	Reg Baines	1924–1926; 1931–1933; 1937–1938	88 (129)	5 (11)	0 (0)	0 (0)	93 (140)
9	Peter Wragg	1956–1963	78 (264)	4 (23)	5 (10)	0 (0)	87 (297)
10	Paul Barnes	1992–1996	76 (148)	0 (5)	5 (10)	4 (16)	85 (179)

=== International caps ===
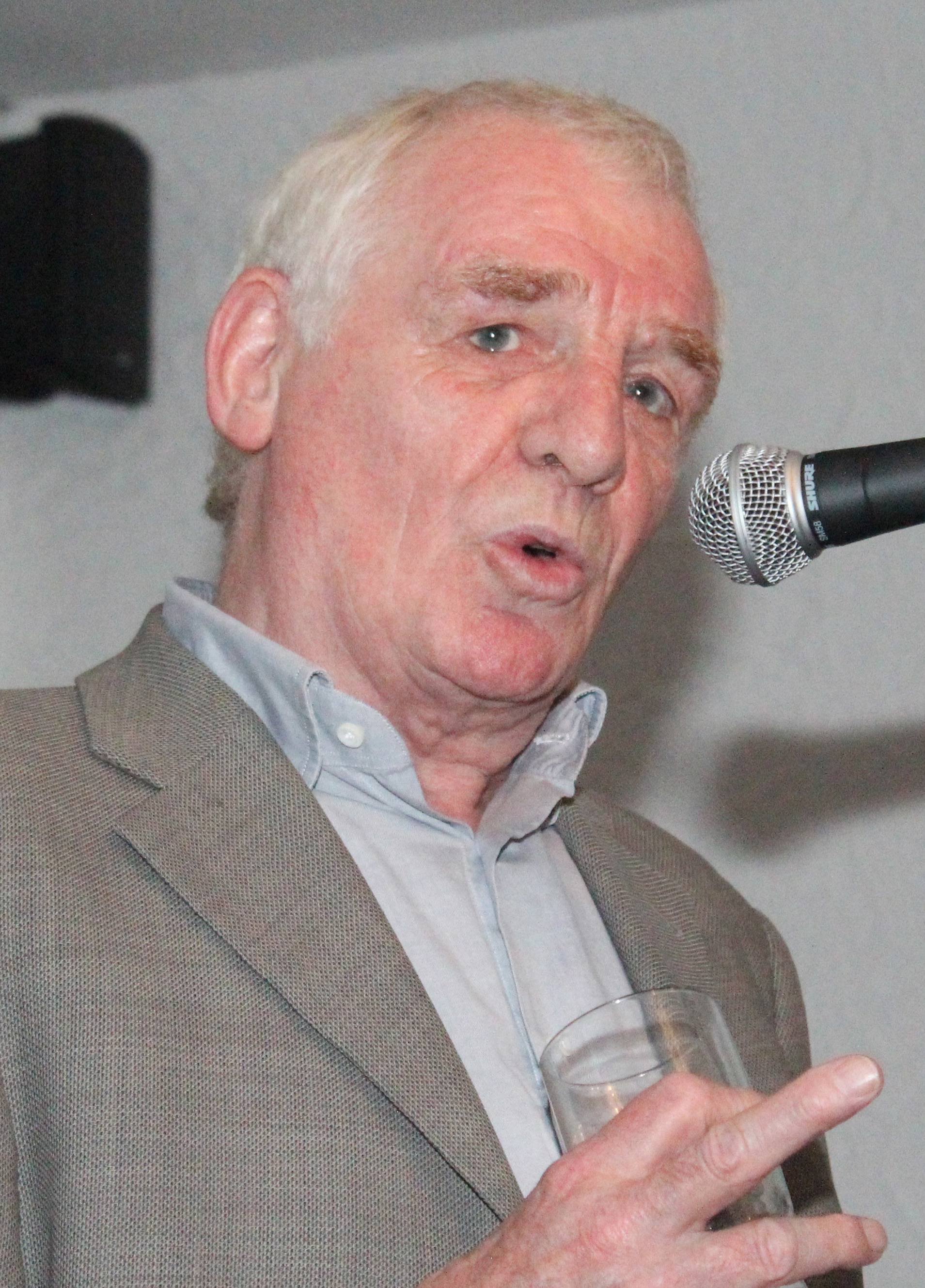
Eamon Dunphy, the club's first capped player

This section refers only to caps earned while a York player.

- First capped player: Eamon Dunphy, for the Republic of Ireland against Spain on 10 November 1965.
- First international goalscorer: Anthony Straker, for Grenada against Haiti on 4 September 2015.
- Most capped player: Peter Scott with 7 caps for Northern Ireland as a York player.

=== Transfers ===
Where a transfer in the record transfer fees tables below involved an initial fee potentially rising to a higher figure depending on contractual clauses being satisfied in the future, the initial fee is listed in the tables beside a footnote detailing any additional payments.

==== Record transfer fees paid ====
Transfer fees paid, club involved, player name, and date of transfer
No.	Fee	Paid to	For	Date	Ref.
1	£140,000	Burnley	Adrian Randall	28 December 1995	
2	£100,000	Southend United	Barry Conlon	16 July 1999	
3	£90,000	Luton Town	Rob Matthews	8 September 1995	
4	£85,000	Oxford United	David Rush	31 January 1997	
5=	£80,000	Bradford City	Neil Tolson	15 July 1996	
5=	£80,000	Hull City	Colin Alcide	22 November 1999	

==== Record transfer fees received ====
Transfer fees received, club involved, player name, and date of transfer
No.	Fee	Received from	For	Date	Ref.
1	£950,000	Sheffield Wednesday	Richard Cresswell	25 March 1999	
2	£700,000 (Note: A clause was included in the transfer which stipulated that York would receive an additional £50,000 should Reading earn promotion during the lifetime of Murty's four-year contract. York claimed that they were owed the payment after Reading won promotion in the 2001–02 season, although Reading argued that the clause no longer applied as Murty had signed a new contract a year earlier. The two clubs agreed on an undisclosed settlement in September 2002.)	Reading	Graeme Murty	6 July 1998	
3	£450,000 (Note: York received an additional £210,000 from a sell-on clause when McCarthy left Port Vale for Birmingham City for a £1.5 million fee in September 1997.)	Port Vale	Jon McCarthy	1 August 1995	
4=	£350,000	Birmingham City	Paul Barnes	3 March 1996	
4=	£350,000 (Note: An appearance-based clause meant that an additional £100,000 would be paid to York for every 5 first-team appearances up to 50 that Greening made for Manchester United. As he made 27 appearances for Manchester United, York received £500,000 in total from this clause. Another contractual clause meant that York would receive 25% of the difference between the fee received by Manchester United should he be transferred and what York had already received from United. York received £287,500 when Greening left Manchester United for Middlesbrough for a £2 million fee in August 2001.)	Manchester United	Jonathan Greening	26 March 1998	
