= Alf Patrick =

English footballer (1921–2021)

Personal information
- Full name: Alfred Patrick
- Date of birth: 25 September 1921
- Place of birth: York, England
- Date of death: 2 November 2021 (aged 100)
- Position: Striker

Senior career*
Years	Team	Apps	(Gls)
1946–1952	York City	228	(109)
1954–1955	Scarborough		
- * Club domestic league appearances and goals

Alfred Patrick (25 September 1921 – 2 November 2021) was an English footballer, who played in the Football League for York City and in the Midland League for Scarborough.

== Life and career ==
Patrick was born in York in September 1921. He made his league debut for York City on 2 November 1946 in a home win against Stockport County, in which he scored. During that season, 1946–47, Patrick scored 17 goals in 23 appearances. The following season, he scored 19 goals in 27 games, but his best season was in 1948–49 when he scored 26 times, including five against Rotherham United in November 1948. This tally of five goals remains an individual club scoring record for York in The Football League.

Patrick became the first York player in peacetime football to score 100 league goals for the club by the end of the 1951–52 season. The following season Patrick finished playing first-team football. He had scored 117 goals in 241 League and Cup appearances for York. This means he is fourth in York's all-time scoring lists behind Norman Wilkinson, Keith Walwyn and Arthur Bottom.

Patrick then went on to have a short spell with Scarborough in the 1954–55 season, until returning to York in a training and coaching capacity with the club's junior side.

He turned 100 in September 2021 and died in November.
