= Richard Brodie (footballer) =

English footballer (born 1987)

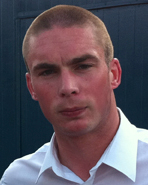
- Brodie with Crawley Town in 2011

Personal information
- Full name: Richard Jon Brodie
- Date of birth: 8 July 1987 (age 39)
- Place of birth: Gateshead, England
- Height: 6 ft 2 in (1.88 m)
- Position: Striker

Team information
- Current team: Skelmersdale United (manager)

Senior career*
Years	Team	Apps	(Gls)
2004–2006	Whickham (Note: The Whickham appearances and goals only cover the 2005–06 season.)	35	(21)
2006–2007	Newcastle Benfield	11	(3)
2007–2010	York City	135	(53)
2008	→ Barrow (loan)	3	(0)
2010–2013	Crawley Town	38	(11)
2011–2012	→ Fleetwood Town (loan)	34	(9)
2012–2013	→ Morecambe (loan)	23	(5)
2013	→ Grimsby Town (loan)	10	(2)
2013–2014	Gateshead	8	(2)
2013	→ Hereford United (loan)	8	(1)
2013–2014	→ Southport (loan)	17	(1)
2014–2015	Southport	37	(12)
2015–2016	Aldershot Town	22	(5)
2016	Stockport County	13	(4)
2016–2017	York City	17	(5)
2016–2017	→ Macclesfield Town (loan)	4	(0)
2017	Boston United	3	(0)
2017	Southport	7	(0)
2017	Skelmersdale United	8	(3)
2017	Solihull Moors	5	(0)
2017–2018	Rushall Olympic		
2018	Warrington Town		
2018	Rushall Olympic	6	(0)
2018–2019	Ramsbottom United		
2019	Ilkeston Town		
2019–2021	Skelmersdale United	39	(9)
2025	Skelmersdale United	1	(0)

International career
2008–2009	England C	2	(0)

Managerial career
- 2022: Skelmersdale United
- 2023: Burscough
- 2024–2025: Glossop North End
- 2025–2026: City of Liverpool
- 2026–: Skelmersdale United
- * Club domestic league appearances and goals as of 16:35, 29 October 2025 (UTC)

Richard Jon Brodie (born 8 July 1987) is an English football manager and player.

Brodie played as a striker and started his career with Whickham and, after being their top scorer in the 2005–06 season, moved to Newcastle Benfield in 2006. He signed for York City in January 2007 and finished 2006–07 with one goal and played in the Conference National play-off semi-final. He started 2007–08 with only 3 goals in 2007, but finished the season with 14 goals. Early in 2008–09, Brodie was loaned to Barrow and scored four goals during a one-month period. He finished the season as York's top scorer with 19 goals and played in their 2009 FA Trophy Final defeat at Wembley Stadium. The 2009–10 season saw Brodie play in York's defeat in the 2010 Conference Premier play-off final at Wembley Stadium and again finish as top scorer, this time with 34 goals. He joined Crawley Town in August 2010 for an undisclosed fee, and with them he won the Conference Premier title in 2010–11.

He joined Fleetwood Town on a season-long loan for 2011–12, winning a second Conference Premier title in as many seasons. Brodie had loan spells with Morecambe and Grimsby Town over 2012–13, and after being released by Crawley joined Gateshead. He was loaned out to Hereford United and Southport, joining the latter permanently in 2014. Having been Southport's top scorer with 14 goals in 2014–15, Brodie joined Aldershot Town but finished 2015–16 with Stockport County. He returned to York in 2016, but was released the following year after a loan spell with Macclesfield Town. This was followed by short spells with Boston United and Southport. He rounded off the final years of his playing career with spells at Skelmersdale United, Solihull Moors, Rushall Olympic, Warrington Town, Ramsbottom United and Ilkeston Town. He earned two caps for the England national C team from 2008 to 2009.

== Club career ==
=== Early life and career ===
Brodie was born in Gateshead, Tyne and Wear, and grew up in the town as a Sunderland supporter. He attended Whickham School and played football for the Gateshead district team as a teenager. He later played youth football with Whickham Fellside Juniors from the age of 10 to 16, Redheugh Boys Club, scoring six goals in a 14–2 victory over Consett Badgers in March 2004, and the Durham County under-18 team, featuring in the FA County Youth Cup in November. Brodie started his senior career in 2004 after making substitute appearances for Whickham in the semi-professional Northern League Division Two before playing for them permanently aged 17. He scored a hat-trick for Whickham in a 5–3 victory over Marske United in November 2005. He scored 21 league goals in 35 appearances for Whickham and was their top scorer in the 2005–06 season.

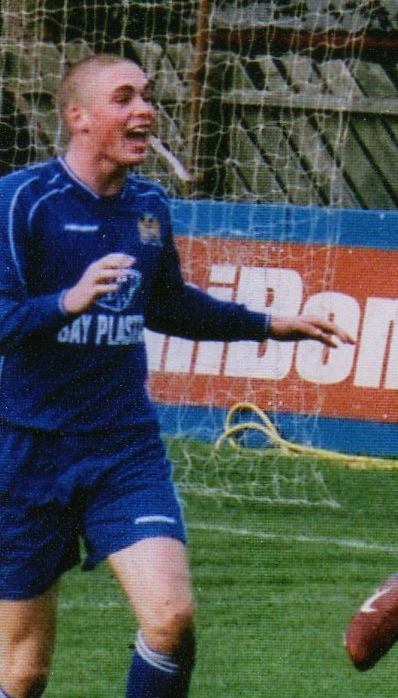
Brodie celebrates a goal with Newcastle Benfield in 2006

Brodie moved to Northern League Division One club Newcastle Benfield in the summer of 2006 and became a popular player at the club. This move came after impressing Benfield manager Paul Baker in a match between the teams, in which Brodie impressed with his physicality. While playing semi-professionally, Brodie took a part-time apprenticeship in joinery and later worked as a full-time joiner. He scored the first goal for Benfield in a friendly against Newcastle United in September, which finished as a 4–3 defeat. Brodie scored the second goal in a 2–0 victory over Cammell Laird with a free kick from 25 yards. He helped Benfield to victory in an FA Vase tie against Castle Vale in December by scoring their second goal in a 2–0 victory, which set up a fifth-round tie against Truro City. He was taken on trial by Premier League team Bolton Wanderers and he played for them in a juniors tournament in France, which ended unsuccessfully after he was played out of position at centre-back. He scored 3 goals in 11 league appearances for Benfield.

=== York City ===
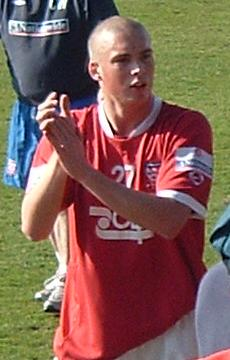
Brodie after a York City match in 2007

After impressing against Conference National club York City in a FA Cup fourth qualifying round tie, Brodie trialled with the club and played in their reserve team, whilst also being allowed to play for Benfield in the FA Vase. He signed for York on transfer deadline day, 31 January 2007, on a contract until the end of 2006–07 for a nominal fee. He scored two minutes into his York debut with the third goal in a 4–0 victory away to Altrincham on 10 February 2007, having entered the match as a 64th-minute substitute. He was sent off during a North Riding Senior Cup match for York's reserves against Scarborough in February 2007, but a suspension did not come into place until 14 days later, meaning he was able to play league-leaders Dagenham & Redbridge. York ranked fourth in the Conference National and Brodie played in both legs of the play-off semi-final defeat to Morecambe, losing 2–1 on aggregate, and finished the season with 14 appearances and 1 goal. In May 2007, York exercised their option to extend his contract for 2007–08.

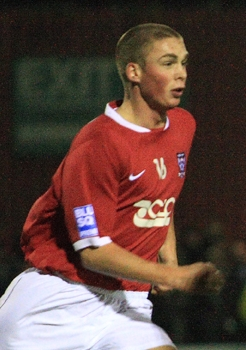
Brodie playing for York City in 2007

Brodie made his first appearance of 2007–08 after being introduced as a 61st-minute substitute at home to Cambridge United on 11 August 2007, but was unable to help the team as they lost 2–1. His first goal of the season came with the opener in a 3–2 home defeat to Rushden & Diamonds on 30 August 2007, and this was followed up with a goal in the following match, a 2–2 home draw with Altrincham. Having not scored since, he received abuse from some sections of the York support during the 6–0 home victory over Rushall Olympic in the FA Cup fourth qualifying round on 27 October 2007. Following this, manager Billy McEwan said "I was disappointed to hear the young players like Richard Brodie getting stick. How can we develop young players if we don't support them?" Brodie and Onome Sodje scored in extra time to give York victory in the Conference League Cup fourth round match away to Stafford Rangers on 22 December 2007, which set a new club record of six successive away victories. Brodie went on to score two goals in stoppage time to give York a 4–3 away win over Droylsden, which drew praise from manager Colin Walker.

He suffered an ankle injury in a reserve match against Darlington on 8 January 2008, and returned to the team for a 2–2 draw away to Altrincham 11 days later. He was dropped from the team against Halifax Town in favour of loanee Leo Fortune-West, and even though manager Walker assured Brodie that he was in the club's long-term plans, Brodie reacted angrily to being substituted for Fortune-West at home to Ebbsfleet United on 29 March 2008. He finished his first full season at York with 14 goals in 48 appearances, as they finished 14th in the Conference Premier. In April 2008, the club took up its option of extending his contract until the end of 2008–09. Newly promoted Conference North club Gateshead made an inquiry for Brodie in June 2008, which was rejected by York. Gateshead later had a four-figure bid rejected, which would have been doubled if they would have won promotion into the Conference Premier the following season.

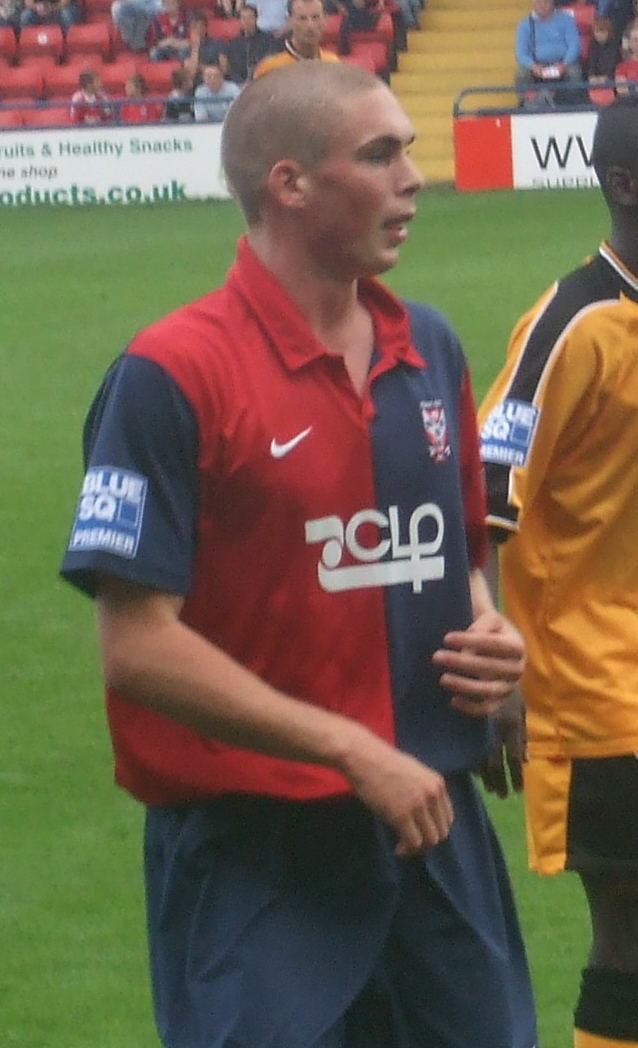
Brodie playing for York City in 2008

Following Martyn Woolford's departure from York, Brodie played on the left wing in the 1–0 away victory over Crawley Town on the opening day of the season. His first goal of the season came after being assisted by Simon Rusk in a 2–2 away draw with Northwich Victoria. After coming on as a substitute in the 68th minute, he was sent off in the 76th minute of a 3–1 away defeat against Wrexham on 7 October 2008, after initially being shown a yellow card for kicking the ball away and then receiving a second card for a tackle on Carl Tremarco, which resulted in him being suspended for York's match against Woking.

=== Barrow loan ===
He joined York's Conference Premier rivals Barrow on a one-month loan on 23 October 2008, having made 15 appearances and scored 3 goals for York up to that point in 2008–09. After Brodie scored two goals on his debut for Barrow in a 4–0 away victory Tamworth in the FA Cup fourth qualifying round, Barrow's joint-manager Darren Sheridan said "He did well and he gives us more options for the team. It was a great debut from him and we know there is still more to come in the next few games". This performance led to him being nominated as Player of the Round for the fourth qualifying round, which was eventually awarded to Sam Hatton of AFC Wimbledon. Barrow revealed that they were hoping to sign him permanently in January 2009 if his loan spell at the club proved successful. He made his league debut for Barrow in a 3–1 home victory over Forest Green Rovers and he scored against Gateshead in the Conference League Cup third round for Barrow, the match finishing 3–1 after extra time. It was agreed for Brodie's loan at the club to be extended following the match, but York overturned this decision a day later. He made his final appearance for Barrow in a 1–0 home defeat to Weymouth on 22 November 2008, finishing the spell with seven appearances and four goals. He later ruled out the possibility of rejoining Barrow in January 2009, saying he was committed to York.

=== Return from loan ===
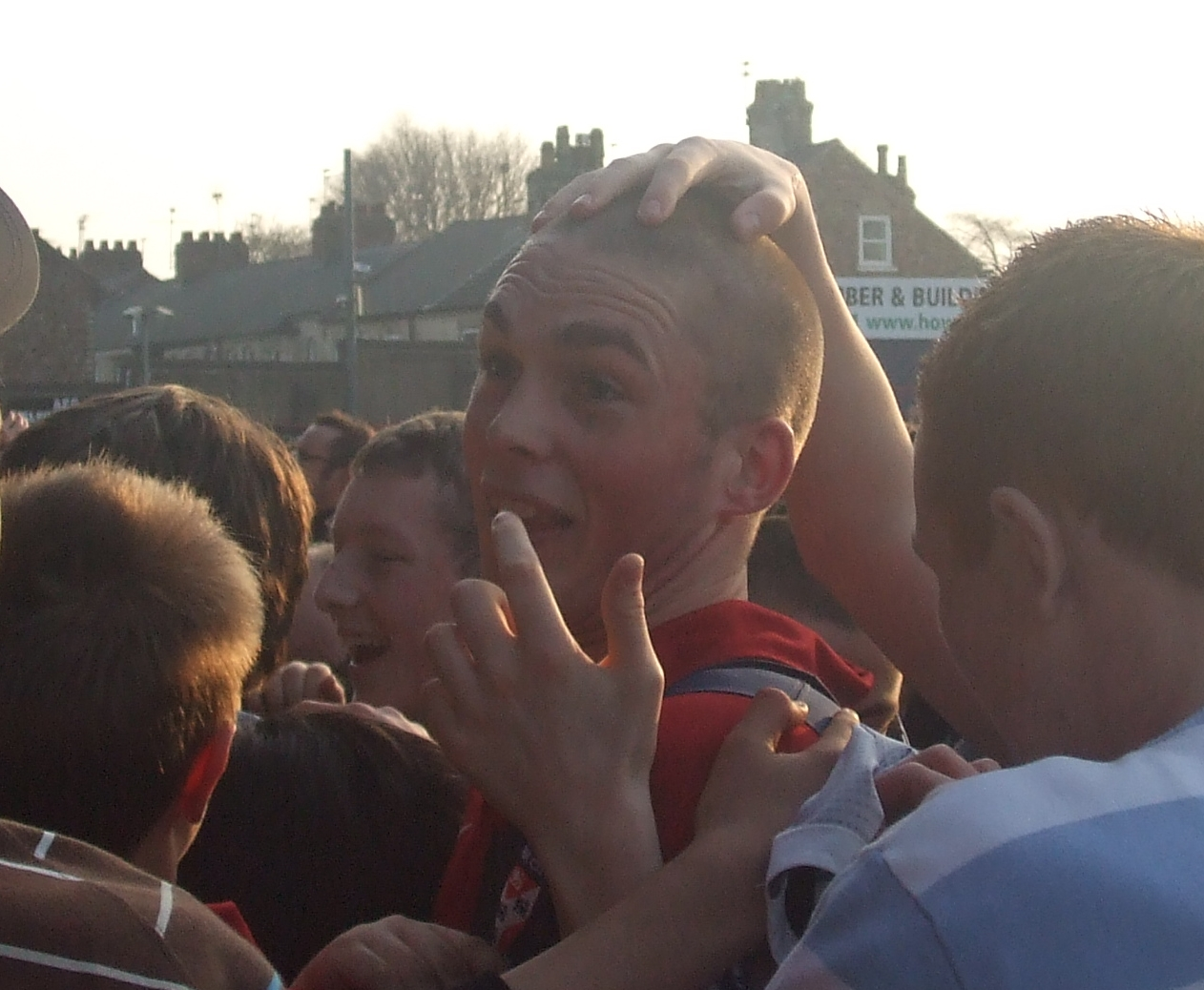
Brodie surrounded by fans after York City's win over AFC Telford United in the FA Trophy semi-final in 2009

He made his first appearance for York following his return a day after making his final appearance for Barrow, coming on as a 61st-minute substitute for Liam Shepherd in a 2–2 draw at home to Crawley on 23 November 2008. Brodie scored York's equaliser in the following match away to Salisbury City on 29 November 2008 with a goal in the 83rd minute, which finished as a 1–1 draw in Martin Foyle's first match as manager. After picking up a yellow card against Salisbury, his fifth of the season for York, he was handed a one-match suspension which saw him miss the match against Grays Athletic. He scored with a 25-yard shot on his return away to Histon on 9 December 2008, which finished as a 1–1 draw. He scored twice against Northwich in the FA Trophy first round as York progressed with a 2–0 away victory, Foyle rating Brodie's first as the "goal of the season". Foyle also stated his desire for Brodie to stay at York, after continued reports of interest from Barrow. Barrow joint-manager David Bayliss said he was unlikely to table a bid for Brodie in January 2009, claiming "If we had a hell of a lot of money we could maybe get him away but we haven't". Foyle responded by saying he had no intention of selling Brodie.

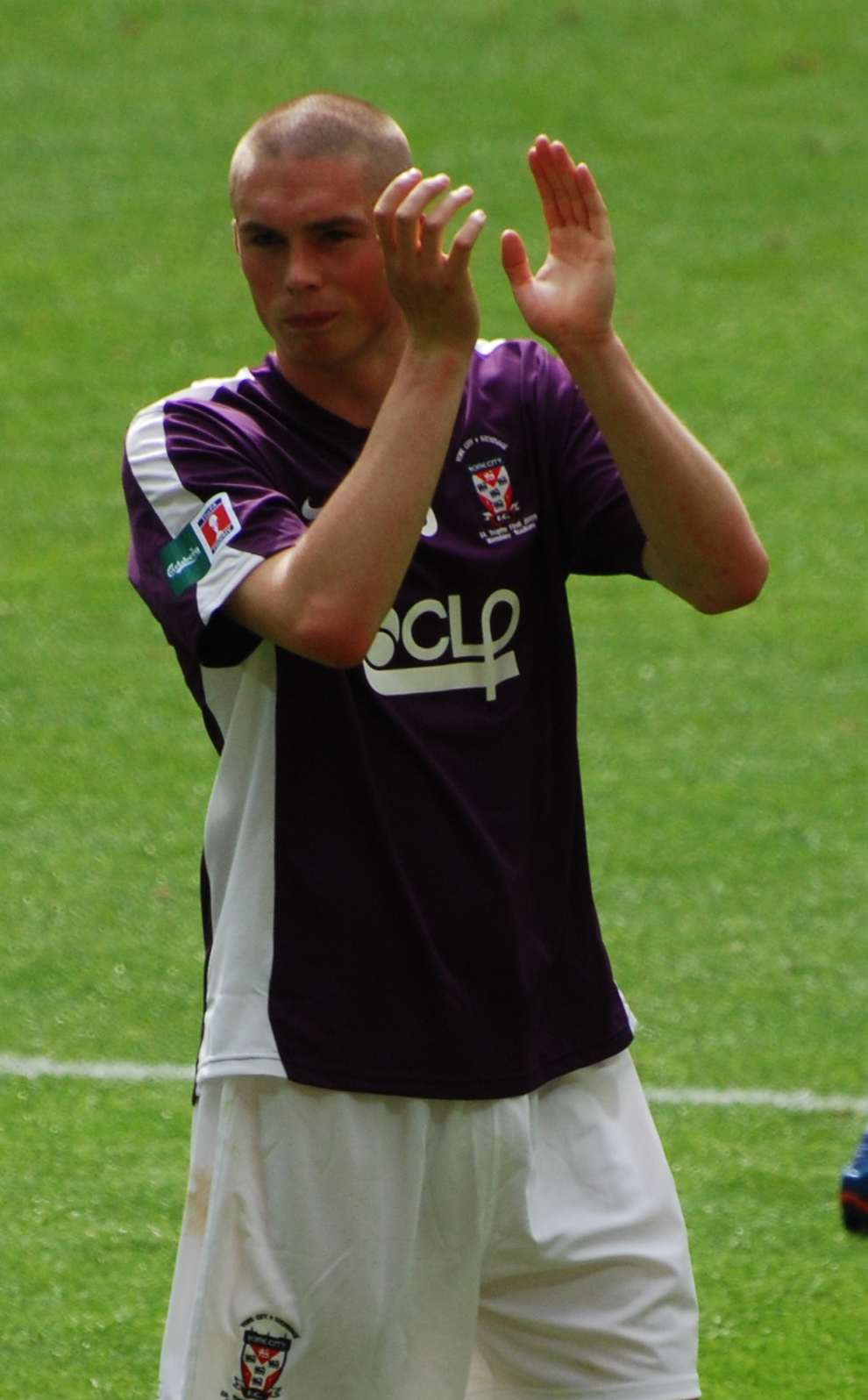
Brodie after playing for York City in the 2009 FA Trophy Final

Brodie scored the winning goal for York in a 2–1 away victory over Oxford United in the FA Trophy second round, ensuring their progression to the third round. He scored York's first goal in a 2–1 home win over AFC Telford United in the FA Trophy semi-final second leg, with the tie being won 4–1 on aggregate, which saw the team reach the final at Wembley Stadium. A yellow card picked up against Kidderminster Harriers on 28 March 2009 resulted in Brodie receiving a two-match suspension, meaning he would miss matches against Grays and Oxford, after being booked on 10 occasions during the season. He returned to the team for a 2–1 home defeat to Northwich on 11 April 2009, and during this match he was fouled in the penalty area, with the penalty kick being scored by Mark Robinson. Brodie scored against Weymouth in a 2–1 away victory on 24 April 2009, which ensured York's survival in the Conference Premier. They finished the season 17th in the table. Brodie started in the 2009 FA Trophy Final at Wembley Stadium on 9 May 2009, which York lost 2–0 to Stevenage Borough. He finished the season as York's top scorer with 19 goals in 46 appearances, and in May 2009 the club exercised its option to extend his contract for 2009–10.

Gateshead made an undisclosed five-figure bid for Brodie in May 2009, which was rejected by York. He signed a new two-year contract with York in June 2009. He scored York's goal on the opening day of 2009–10 in a match away to Oxford, which finished as a 2–1 defeat. After a run of entering three matches as a substitute, he started against Gateshead away and scored York's first goal with a 12-yard shot in a 2–1 victory. Brodie won a penalty against Crawley after being fouled by Dominic Collins, which he scored six minutes into the match, before passing the ball to Michael Gash, who scored the second goal in a 2–0 victory. Following the match, Foyle commented on their partnership, saying "They are doing well together because Michael leads the line very well and Richard looks to hit the flanks." After receiving a yellow card in a home match with Oxford on 17 October 2009 for kicking the ball away, which was his fifth booking of the season, he was handed a one-match suspension for York's match against Luton Town. York claimed the booking was the result of mistaken identity, as Adam Smith was the player who committed the offence, and an appeal with the Football Association was lodged. The ban was overturned and he played for York in a 1–1 draw on 20 October 2009, assisting Neil Barrett's goal for York with a pass.

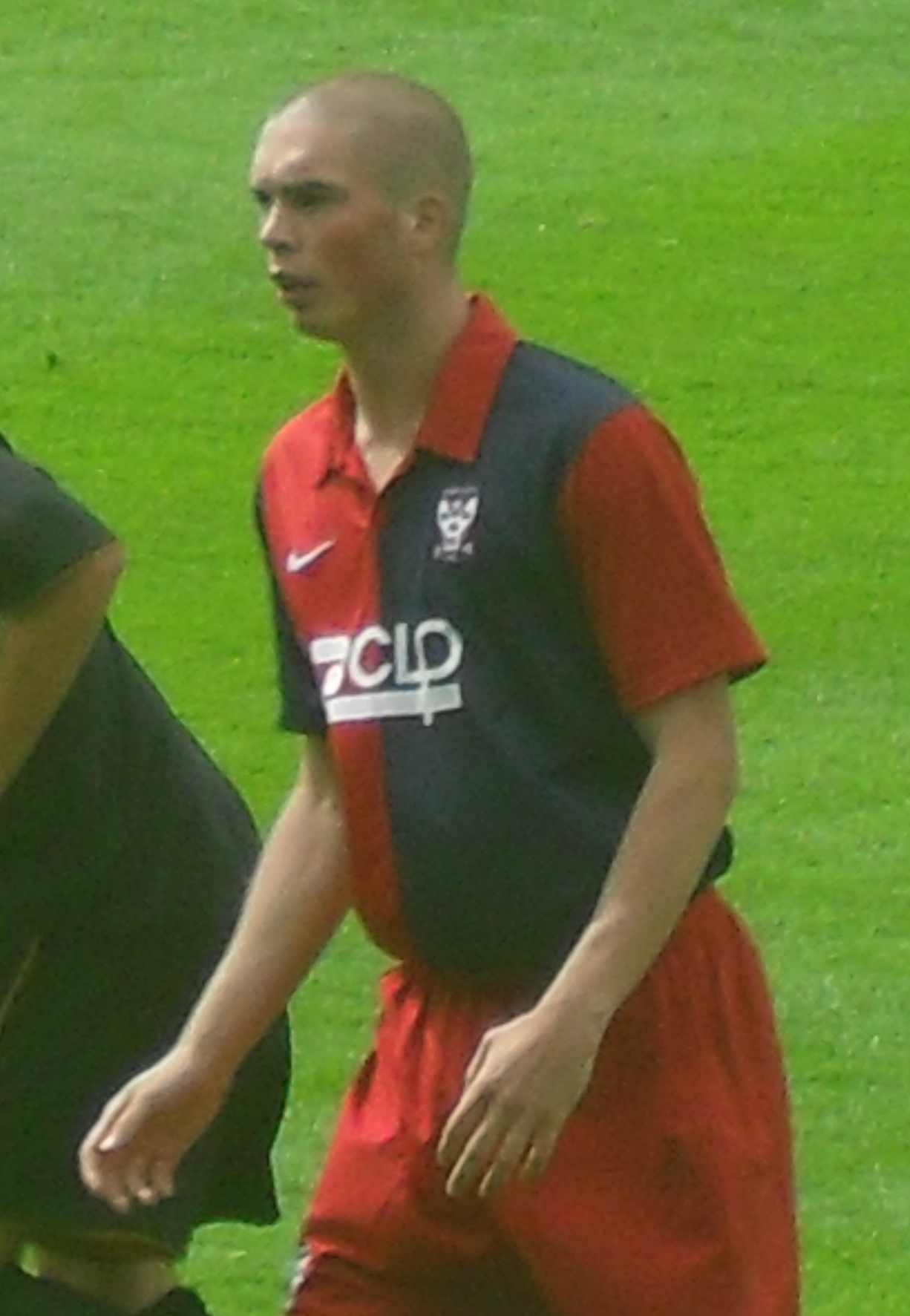
Brodie playing for York City in 2009

He scored twice for York in a 3–2 home victory over League Two team Crewe Alexandra in the FA Cup first round on 7 November 2009, which included the first and final goals. Following this, he was voted Player of the Round for the FA Cup first round. In the following match, he scored his first hat-trick for York, with three goals in a 3–2 home win over Chester City on 10 November 2009. After picking up a yellow card against AFC Wimbledon on 21 November 2009, Brodie was handed a one-match suspension, which resulted in him missing a match against Gateshead. He was named the Conference Premier Player of the Month for November 2009, during which he scored six goals in five appearances. Brodie scored his 20th goal of the season in a 2–1 home victory over Wrexham, a result that equalled the club record for successive victories in all competitions with eight. This goal broke the club record for reaching 20 goals in a season in the quickest time, beating Arthur Bottom's record by six days. Brodie played for York in the FA Cup third round against Premier League team Stoke City, in which they were beaten 3–1 away. He scored two goals and provided an assist in a 4–1 home win over Hayes & Yeading United, which broke the club record for consecutive league victories with eight. League Two team Grimsby Town made an offer for Brodie in January 2010, with chairman John Fenty's offer being rejected as it did not meet York's valuation.

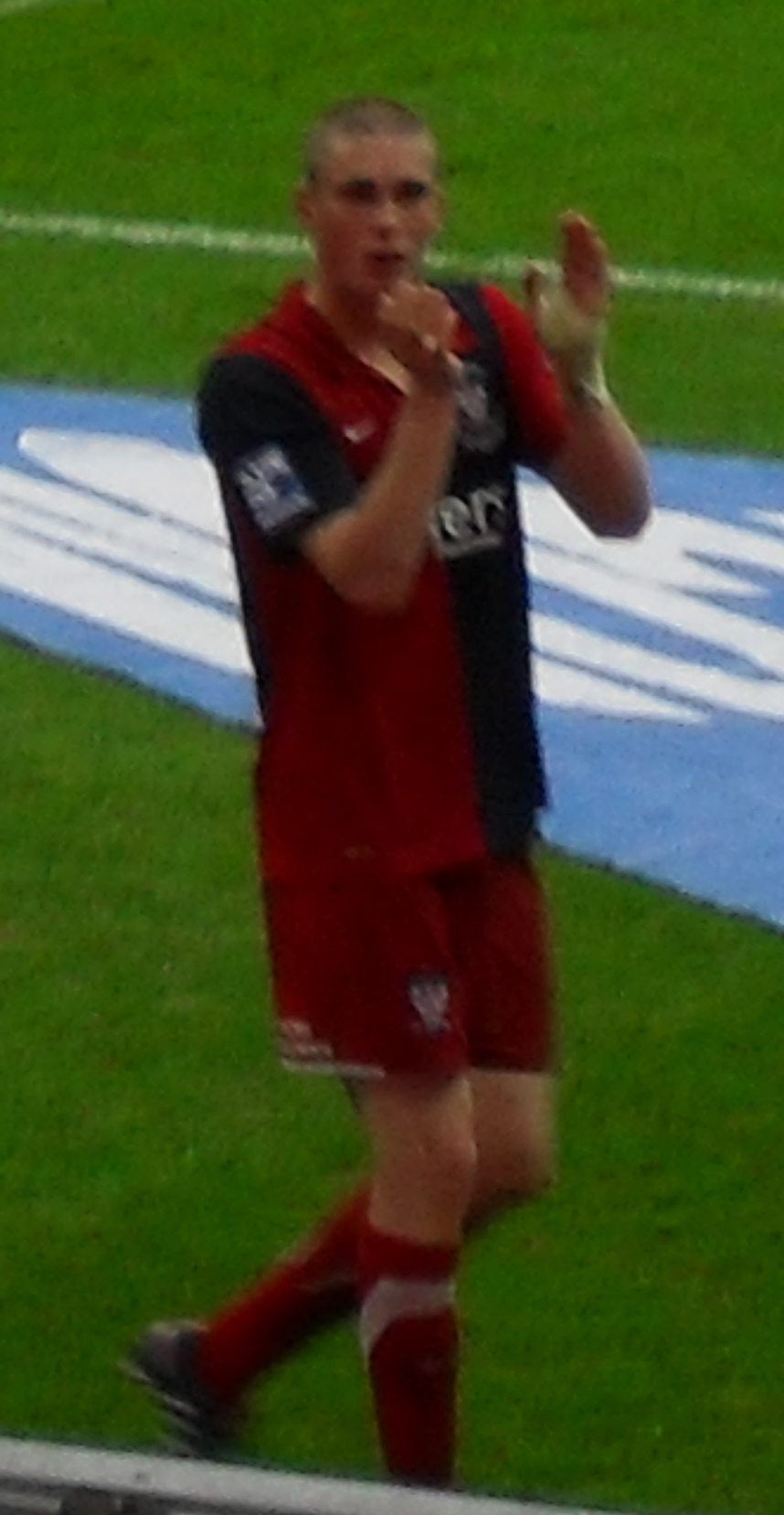
Brodie after playing for York City in the 2010 Conference Premier play-off final

He was handed a two-match suspension after receiving his 10th yellow card of the season during a 1–0 home victory over Newport County in an FA Trophy second round replay on 26 January 2010. He returned in a 1–0 away win over Kettering on 6 February 2010, before being handed a three-match suspension as a result of being sent off during a 1–0 away defeat to Ebbsfleet a week later after his elbow caught Dean Pooley. This resulted in a head wound that required three stitches for Pooley, and York's directors and manager apologised to Ebbsfleet manager Liam Daish for the tackle. Following Chester's expulsion from the Football Conference in March 2010, the three goals Brodie scored against them were discounted as their results were expunged. He scored for the first time in 12 matches with 2 goals in a 4–0 victory away to Grays on 30 March 2010. He scored two goals against Barrow on 13 April 2010 in a 3–0 home victory, a result that confirmed York's place in the play-offs.

Brodie was named as York's Players' Player of the Year for the season, as well as being awarded the Keith Walwyn Golden Boot, having scored 32 goals at that point. York finished fifth in the Conference Premier, and Brodie was the division's joint top scorer alongside Matt Tubbs with 26 goals. He scored the winning goal on 89 minutes to give York a 1–0 home victory against Luton in the play-off semi-final first leg. He played in the 1–0 away victory in the second leg, meaning York won the tie 2–0 on aggregate. After the match, Brodie was hit by a coin, with the squad being forced into the back of a stand after missiles were thrown at them by a section of Luton fans. He started in the 2010 Conference Premier play-off final at Wembley Stadium on 16 May 2010, in which York lost 3–1 to Oxford. He finished 2009–10 with 51 appearances and 34 goals, making him York's highest goalscorer in a season since Bottom scored 39 in 1954–55. York entered negotiations over a new contract with Brodie after the end of the season. At the Football Conference's Annual Presentation Dinner, he was named the Conference Premier Player of the Year and a member of the Team of the Year.

York's Conference Premier rivals Crawley had a £125,000 bid for Brodie rejected during the summer of 2010, and he scored his first goal of 2010–11 with a penalty in a 3–0 home win over Altrincham on 28 August. However, Brodie's form for York early in the season had been unsettled by Crawley's interest in signing him, which he claimed to have been aware of for "about a month to six weeks" after Crawley manager Steve Evans made an inquiry about him in July 2010.

=== Crawley Town ===
He signed for Crawley for an undisclosed fee on 31 August 2010, the transfer being completed three minutes before the transfer deadline. The fee was reported by The Press to be around £300,000, although Crawley co-owner Bruce Winfield dismissed this figure, saying "it was nowhere near that". The Non-League Paper reported the fee to be £275,500; if true, this meant a new record had been set for the highest transfer fee between two non-League clubs. After signing, Brodie said "What they're trying to plan here and the aims this club have got is to be a Football League club. They've got as good a chance as anybody." He made his debut as a 55th-minute substitute in a 1–1 home draw with Fleetwood Town on 4 September 2010. On his first start, Brodie scored his first goal for Crawley with the second goal in a 2–0 victory away to Histon on 11 September 2010. Crawley rejected an offer for him from an unnamed League Two club in January 2011. Brodie struggled to force his way into the Crawley starting line-up on a regular basis, and finished the season with 13 goals in 45 appearances for Crawley as the club won the Conference Premier title and therefore promotion into League Two.

=== Loan spells ===
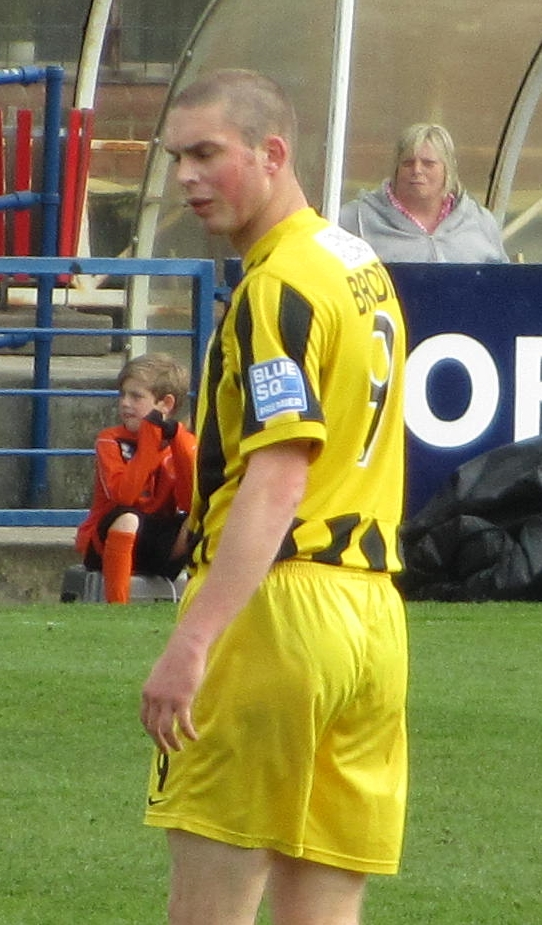
Brodie playing for Fleetwood Town in 2012

On 16 May 2011, Brodie signed for Conference Premier club Fleetwood Town on loan for 2011–12 for a five-figure loan fee. Homesickness was cited as the reason for the transfer, with manager Evans saying "Richard is a very talented lad but it is no secret he has failed to settle away from his family home". Brodie debuted as a 54th-minute substitute for Magno Vieira in Fleetwood's 2–0 away win over Grimsby on 13 August 2011. His first goal for Fleetwood was the team's fifth goal in a 5–2 home victory over Kidderminster on 20 September 2011. Brodie's sixth goal for Fleetwood came on 26 December 2011 against Southport, when he scored a late equaliser in the 88th minute to make the score 2–2 in front of 3,029 supporters, a record home league attendance for Fleetwood. He scored twice during the away league match against the same club on 1 January 2012, the first coming after just four minutes and the second coming in the 29th minute, which made the score 3–0 to Fleetwood. Two minutes after scoring his second goal Brodie was sent off after receiving a second yellow card, although his team went on to win the match 6–0. He made 39 appearances and scored 10 goals in 2011–12 and won his second Conference Premier winner's medal in as many seasons, as Fleetwood won the title and therefore promotion into League Two.

Brodie joined League Two club Morecambe on 19 July 2012 on a six-month loan. He made his debut in Morecambe's 2012–13 opener as a 54th-minute substitute for Jordan Burrow in their 2–1 away victory over Championship team Blackpool on 12 August 2012 in the League Cup first round. His first start came on 18 August 2012 in Morecambe's 3–0 win away to Exeter City on 18 August 2012. Having scored 6 goals in 27 appearances, he returned to Crawley on 2 January 2013 as Morecambe were not in a financial position to extend his loan. On 4 January 2013, Brodie joined Conference Premier team Grimsby Town on loan until the end of 2012–13. He made his debut the following day, starting Grimsby's 1–1 home draw with Hereford United, before scoring his first goal in a 4–2 win at home to Alfreton Town on 2 February 2013. Brodie was released from his loan spell on 25 March 2013, the day after he missed a penalty in the 4–1 penalty shoot-out defeat against Wrexham in the 2013 FA Trophy Final at Wembley Stadium. He had scored 2 goals in 15 appearances for Grimsby.

=== Gateshead ===
Brodie was released by Crawley at the end of the season and went on trial with Hartlepool United, who were newly relegated into League Two. He instead signed for Conference Premier club Gateshead on 15 May 2013 on a one-year contract. He scored on his debut away to Kidderminster on 10 August 2013, although Gateshead went on to lose 3–1. After scoring twice in his first seven appearances for Gateshead, Brodie signed for their Conference Premier rivals Hereford United on a one-month loan on 13 September 2013, being reunited with former York manager Foyle. He made his debut later that day in Hereford's 2–0 home defeat to Aldershot Town, and scored his only goal for the club in a 1–1 draw away to FC Halifax Town on 21 September 2013. He returned to Gateshead after the loan expired, having made eight appearances and scored one goal for Hereford.

=== Southport ===
Brodie was loaned out again on 21 November 2013, joining fellow Conference Premier club Southport until January 2014. He made his Southport debut two days later in a 5–1 defeat away to Aldershot and scored his first goal on 28 December 2013 in a 2–1 away loss against Alfreton. On 3 January 2014, Brodie's loan at Southport was extended until the end of the season. He completed the loan spell with 1 goal from 18 appearances as Southport finished 18th in the Conference Premier. At the end of the season, Brodie was released by Gateshead in May 2014.

Brodie joined Southport permanently on 18 June 2014, being signed by his former York and Hereford manager Foyle. His first appearance after signing permanently came as a 62nd-minute substitute for Scott Kay in a 0–0 away draw with Torquay United on 16 August 2014, before starting the following match, a 2–1 home win over Altrincham a week later, scoring Southport's first goal after reacting first to a John Marsden header that had hit the post. Brodie was Southport's top scorer in 2014–15 with 14 goals from 41 appearances as Southport finished 19th in the Conference Premier. He signed a new contract with the club in May 2015.

=== Aldershot Town and Stockport County ===
Although he signed a new contract with Southport, Brodie signed for their National League rivals Aldershot Town on 14 August 2015 on a one-year contract. He debuted the following day as a 58th-minute substitute in a 3–0 away defeat to Wrexham, but started the following match, a 1–1 home draw with Dover Athletic, in which he scored Aldershot's equalising goal on 36 minutes from a Jim Stevenson pass. Having scored 5 goals from 26 appearances, Brodie left Aldershot by mutual consent on 29 January 2016, so he could move closer to home for family reasons. A day later, he joined National League North club Stockport County and played for them on a part-time basis. Brodie scored on his debut with a close-range header in Stockport's 2–1 away defeat to Harrogate Town on 2 February 2016. He scored 4 goals from 13 appearances as Stockport ranked ninth in the National League North. He was released by the club in May 2016.

=== Return to York City ===
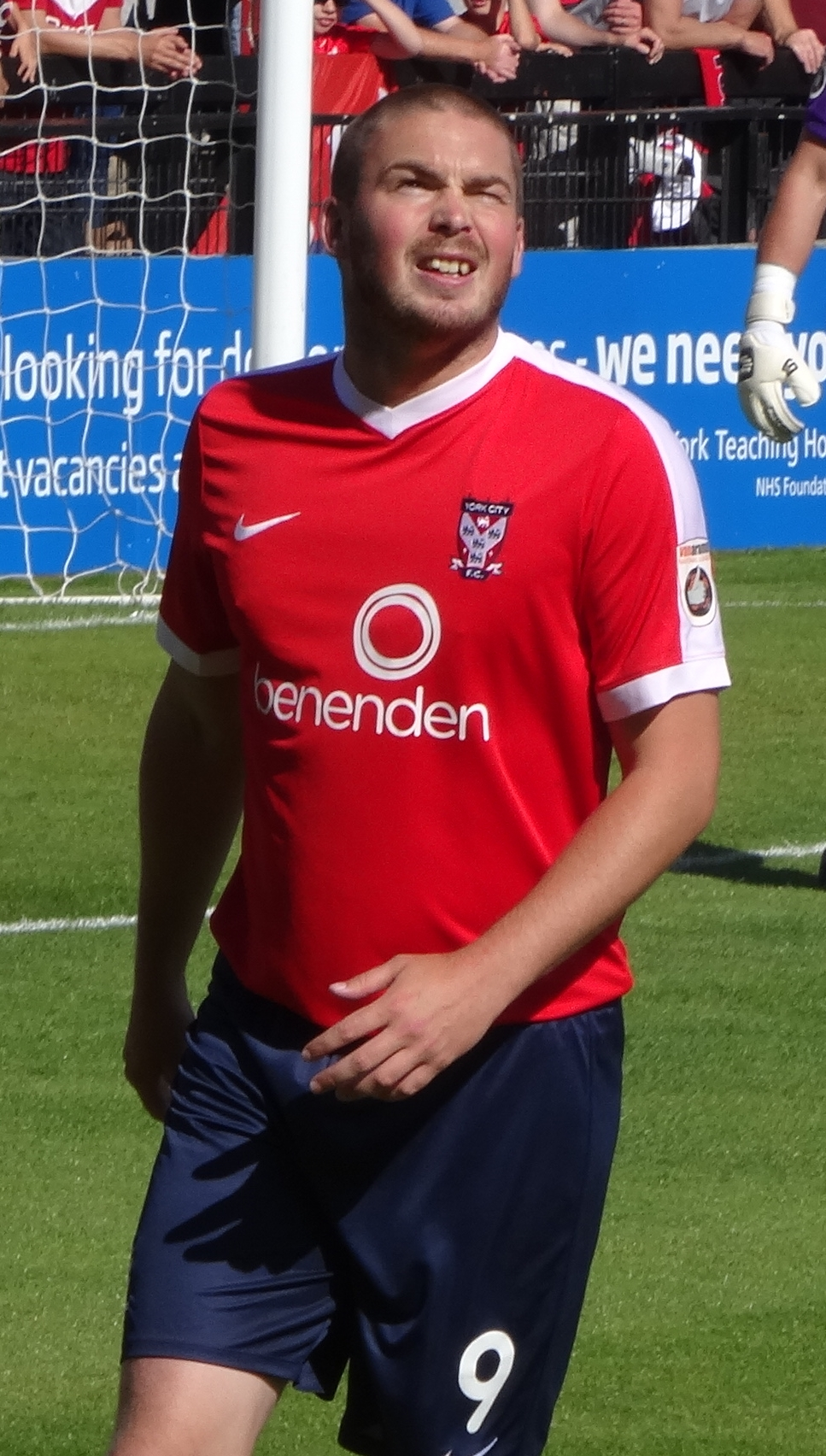
Brodie playing for York City in 2016

Brodie re-signed for York City, who were newly relegated into the National League, on 17 May 2016 on a one-year contract. He made his second debut for York as an 84th-minute substitute in a 1–1 away draw with Maidstone United. Having struggled to come to terms with the physical requirements of returning to professional football, Brodie was told by manager Jackie McNamara that he would not start home matches until improving his fitness levels. Brodie scored his first goal of 2016–17 with a penalty in first-half stoppage time away against Gateshead on 16 August 2016, with York losing 6–1. This marked the start of a run of five goals from five matches, with McNamara praising his ability to score different types of goals, having scored with a header, a penalty, a left-footed volley and two right-footed shots in this run. Despite being York's top scorer with seven goals, new manager Gary Mills suggested in November 2016 that Brodie was not fit enough to play under him.

On 17 November 2016, he joined York's National League rivals Macclesfield Town on loan until 1 January 2017, with Mills unimpressed with his fitness levels and disciplinary record. Mills implied that Brodie would only be considered for selection on his return if he were to reach full fitness. Brodie made his debut two days later as an 88th-minute substitute in Macclesfield's 2–1 away win over Aldershot. He only made the starting line-up once for Macclesfield, with three of his four appearances for the club coming as a substitute. Upon his return to York, Brodie was given permission by Mills to leave, as he wanted to find a club where he would play more regularly. He left York by mutual consent on 11 January 2017.

=== Later career ===
On 12 January 2017, Brodie signed for National League North club Boston United on a contract until the end of 2016–17, with the option of a further year. He debuted on 21 January 2017 when starting Boston's 2–0 away win over Bradford Park Avenue, in which he was substituted in the 75th minute. Having made only three appearances, Brodie's contract with Boston was terminated on 15 February 2017, because of what manager Adam Murray described as an "internal matter". Brodie re-signed for National League club Southport on 18 March 2017, joining in time to be an unused substitute in their 2–0 away defeat to Braintree Town. He made his debut a week later, starting in Southport's 1–0 home win over Boreham Wood, in which he was substituted for Andrai Jones on 61 minutes. Brodie made seven appearances as Southport were relegated to the National League North after finishing in 23rd place in 2016–17. In July 2017, he had an unsuccessful trial with National League North club Darlington.

Brodie signed for Northern Premier League Division One North club Skelmersdale United on 4 August 2017. He made his debut on 12 August 2017, starting Skelmersdale's 1–0 away defeat to Brighouse Town on the opening day of 2017–18. After scoring 3 goals from 10 appearances for Skelmersdale, Brodie signed for National League club Solihull Moors on 22 September 2017. He made his debut the following day, starting in their 2–2 home draw with Dagenham & Redbridge, with manager Liam McDonald praising Brodie's partnership with Oladapo Afolayan. Brodie was released by Solihull on 26 October 2017, having failed to score in five appearances for the club.

He signed for Northern Premier League Premier Division club Rushall Olympic on 28 October 2017, scoring on his debut the same day with a 75th-minute penalty in a 2–0 home win over Nantwich Town in the FA Trophy second qualifying round. He scored the opening goal in the Walsall Senior Cup final on 17 May 2018, which Rushall won 4–3 in a penalty shoot-out after a 2–2 extra-time draw. Brodie signed for Rushall's Northern Premier League Premier Division rivals Warrington Town on 20 June 2018. He left the club on 9 September 2018, having scored twice, after Brodie told manager Paul Carden that he wanted to play more regularly. He returned to Rushall Olympic, now in the Southern League Premier Division Central, the same month before signing for Northern Premier League Division One West club Ramsbottom United on 23 December.

Brodie signed for Midland League Premier Division club Ilkeston Town on 20 February 2019 to provide competition for striker Alex Marshall. He moved back to North West Counties League Premier Division club Skelmersdale United on 21 August. He had made 28 appearances and scored 8 goals in all competitions by the time the 2019–20 season was abandoned and results expunged because of the COVID-19 pandemic in England.

In October 2025, Brodie came out of retirement to resign for Skelmersdale United.

== International career ==
Brodie was named in the England national C team, who represent England at non-League level, for a friendly away to Bosnia and Herzegovina on 16 September 2008. He started the match, but was substituted after 60 minutes, the match finishing a 6–2 defeat. He was named on standby for the 2007–2009 International Challenge Trophy match against the Belgium under-21 team on 19 May 2009. He was given a second call-up for the match away to Poland under-23 team on 17 November 2009. Brodie started the match and had a goal disallowed, before being substituted on 65 minutes after picking up a foot injury. This was the final of two caps earned for England C.

== Style of play ==
Brodie plays as a striker and was described by the Times & Star as a "prolific" goalscorer. After making his debut for York in February 2007, Dave Flett of The Press said Brodie "looks a potent package of pace and power with a competitive streak that should strike fear into countless Conference defenders". Foyle's guidance while manager at York was credited as benefiting Brodie. He stated "I've worked hard trying to improve my game and I'm starting to score different types of goals" in December 2009. He was described by the Huddersfield Daily Examiner as "one of non-league football's hottest properties" in January 2010. After signing for Crawley in August 2010, manager Evans said "The lad is a terrific player, he works very hard for the team and gets a goal".

== Coaching career ==
On 19 November 2021, Brodie joined Ashton Athletic as a first team coach, he had previously been coaching with Skelmersdale United where he was also registered as a player.

On 5 September 2022, Brodie was appointed manager of Skelmersdale United.

On 16 May 2023, Brodie was named as Burscough manager.

On 24 October 2023, Brodie was named as caretaker manager of Glossop North End A.F.C. and later, on 4 January 2024, became the permanent manager of Glossop North End A.F.C.. He was removed from the role on 22 October 2025, following 7 losses in a row.

On 25 November 2025, Brodie was appointed manager of City of Liverpool.

On 7 March 2026, Brodie parted company with the club.

== Personal life ==
Brodie coached and mentored the Southport College team in 2014–15, and organised a charity match between them and the Redheugh Boys Club in May 2015 to raise money for Diabetes UK. His partner gave birth to their first child in August 2016.

== Career statistics ==
As of 23 December 2018

Appearances and goals by club, season and competition
Club	Season	League			FA Cup		League Cup		Other		Total	
Club	Season	Division	Apps	Goals	Apps	Goals	Apps	Goals	Apps	Goals	Apps	Goals
Whickham	2005–06	Northern League Division Two	35	21			—				35	21
Newcastle Benfield	2006–07	Northern League Division One	11	3			—				11	3
York City	2006–07	Conference National	12	1	—		—		2 (Note: Appearances in Conference National play-offs)	0	14	1
York City	2007–08	Conference Premier	39	10	2	0	—		7 (Note: Two appearances and three goals in Conference League Cup, five appearances and one goal in FA Trophy)	4	48	14
York City	2008–09	Conference Premier	38	15	—		—		8 (Note: Appearance(s) in FA Trophy)	4	46	19
York City	2009–10	Conference Premier	40	26	4	4	—		7 (Note: Four appearances and three goals in FA Trophy, three appearances and one goal in Conference Premier play-offs)	4	51	34
York City	2010–11	Conference Premier	6	1	—		—		—		6	1
York City	Total		135	53	6	4	—		24	12	165	69
Barrow (loan)	2008–09	Conference Premier	3	0	3	3	—		1 (Note: Appearance in Conference League Cup)	1	7	4
Crawley Town	2010–11	Conference Premier	38	11	6	1	—		1	1	45	13
Fleetwood Town (loan)	2011–12	Conference Premier	34	9	4	1	—		1	0	39	10
Morecambe (loan)	2012–13	League Two	23	5	0	0	2	0	2 (Note: Appearances in Football League Trophy)	1	27	6
Grimsby Town (loan)	2012–13	Conference Premier	10	2	—		—		5	0	15	2
Gateshead	2013–14	Conference Premier	8	2	0	0	—		—		8	2
Hereford United (loan)	2013–14	Conference Premier	8	1	0	0	—		—		8	1
Southport (loan)	2013–14	Conference Premier	17	1	—		—		1	0	18	1
Southport	2014–15	Conference Premier	36	12	5	2	—		0	0	41	14
Southport	2015–16	National League	1	0	—		—		—		1	0
Southport	Total		54	13	5	2	—		1	0	60	15
Aldershot Town	2015–16	National League	22	5	3	0	—		1	0	26	5
Stockport County	2015–16	National League North	13	4	—		—		—		13	4
York City	2016–17	National League	17	5	2	2	—		0	0	19	7
Macclesfield Town (loan)	2016–17	National League	4	0	—		—		—		4	0
Boston United	2016–17	National League North	3	0	—		—		—		3	0
Southport	2016–17	National League	7	0	—		—		—		7	0
Skelmersdale United	2017–18	Northern Premier League; Division One North	8	3	2	0	—		—		10	3
Solihull Moors	2017–18	National League	5	0	—		—		—		5	0
Rushall Olympic	2018–19	Southern League Premier Division Central	6	0			—				6	0
Career total			444	137	31	13	2	0	36	15	513	165

== Honours ==
York City

- FA Trophy runner-up: 2008–09

Crawley Town

- Conference Premier: 2010–11

Fleetwood Town

- Conference Premier: 2011–12

Grimsby Town

- FA Trophy runner-up: 2012–13

Rushall Olympic

- Walsall Senior Cup: 2017–18

Individual

- Conference Premier Player of the Year: 2009–10
- Conference Premier Team of the Year: 2009–10
