= Whickham School =

Location
- Burnthouse Lane; Whickham; Tyne and Wear, NE16 5AR; England; 54.940°N 1.685°W

Information
- Type: Academy
- Local authority: Gateshead
- Department for Education URN: 137360 Tables
- Ofsted: Reports
- Headteacher: Fraser Turnbull
- Gender: Coeducational
- Age: 11 to 18
- Enrolment: 1601
- Website: http://www.whickhamschool.org/

Whickham School is a coeducational secondary school and sixth form located in Whickham (near Gateshead) in Tyne and Wear, England.

Formerly known as Whickham Comprehensive School, it opened in 1962 as a replacement for the small, 'all-age' Victorian school in the village centre; a much larger school was required due to the large house-building programme that was taking place. It holds around 1700 pupils between the ages of 11-19 and has 300 members of staff. It offers a range of vocational and traditional qualifications at Key Stage 4 and 5, including GCSE, BTEC, and A-Level.

== School performance ==
The school has good academic achievement, and is the largest sixth form in Gateshead.

The last Ofsted inspection judged the school as Good with five areas of the school judged Outstanding.

The ‘Outstanding’ areas were:

1 - The quality of learning for pupils with special educational needs and /or disabilities and their progress 2 - The extent to which pupils feel safe 3 - Pupils’ attendance 4 - The effectiveness of care, guidance and support 5 - The effectiveness of partnerships in promoting wellbeing

== Fire ==
On 21 March 2008, there was a fire which destroyed the staff room, library, two music rooms, sixth form common room, and study area. New and improved Sixth Form facilities opened ready for the academic year beginning in September 2009.

== Legal challenge to school uniform ==
In June 1999, University Professor Claire Hale took legal action against the School when they refused permission to allow her daughter Jo Hale to wear trousers. Amongst others, the Equal Opportunities Commission decided to back the case. On 24 February 2000 the school avoided a legal battle by announcing that, in future, girls would be able to wear trousers.

== Notable former pupils ==
- Richard Brodie, footballer
- Mark Stoneman, cricketer for Middlesex County Cricket Club and England
