= Billy Fenton =

English footballer

Personal information
- Full name: William Hartas Fenton
- Date of birth: 23 June 1926
- Place of birth: Hartlepool, England
- Date of death: 16 April 1973 (aged 46)
- Place of death: York, England
- Height: 5 ft 9 in (1.75 m)
- Position: Winger

Senior career*
Years	Team	Apps	(Gls)
1944–?	Barnsley	0	(0)
?–1948	Horden Colliery Welfare	?	(?)
1948–1951	Blackburn Rovers	33	(7)
1951–1958	York City	257	(118)
1958–1959	Scarborough	?	(10)
Total		290	(125)
- * Club domestic league appearances and goals

William Hartas Fenton (23 June 1926 – 16 April 1973) was an English footballer. He played as a left-winger in the immediate post-Second World War period. The highest level he played at was with Blackburn Rovers, but he spent most of his professional career with York City.

== Career ==
Born in Hartlepool, County Durham, Fenton started his career with Barnsley, whom he signed for in November 1944. After leaving Barnsley he returned to his native North-East, playing for Horden Colliery Welfare. In December 1948 Fenton joined Blackburn Rovers, then in the Second Division. He was not a regular at the club, playing only 33 times in the next two and a half seasons.

Fenton signed for York City in May 1951 for a small fee, and in his first season scored 31 goals, setting a new record for the club, which was previously held by Reg Baines. He was part of the team which played in the FA Cup semi-final in 1955. Fenton stayed with York City for several seasons, writing himself into the club's history books by scoring 124 goals in 278 games, making him the third highest goalscorer in the club's history after Norman Wilkinson and Keith Walwyn.

After leaving York, Fenton went on to play for another North Yorkshire side, Scarborough, whom he signed for in July 1958. He scored 12 goals in 29 appearances for the Midland League side in all competitions, including 10 goals in the league in the 1958–59 season.

Fenton died in York at the age of 46 on 16 April 1973. The Billy Fenton Memorial Trophy is presented annually by his widow Margo to York City's Clubman of the Year.

== Honours ==
- 1954-55 - FA Cup semi-finalist (York City)
