= Tom Fenoughty (footballer, born 1905) =

English footballer

Personal information
- Full name: Thomas Fenoughty
- Date of birth: 7 July 1905
- Place of birth: Rotherham, England
- Date of death: 2001 (aged 95–96)
- Position: Inside forward

Senior career*
Years	Team	Apps	(Gls)
1925–1927	Rotherham United	0	(0)
1927–1934	York City	229	(97)
1934	Sheffield United	0	(0)
1934–1936	Rotherham United	64	(22)
	Gainsborough Trinity	?	(?)
- * Club domestic league appearances and goals

Thomas Fenoughty (7 July 1905 – 2001) was an English footballer.

== Career ==
Born in Rotherham, Fenoughty started his career with Rotherham United in 1925. He was spotted playing Sunday School football in Rotherham and joined York City in 1927. York reluctantly parted company with him in 1934 as the club were facing financial difficulties, after having made 252 appearances and scoring 104 goals for the club. He was given a benefit match against Leeds United and offered to loan this benefit to the club. He joined Sheffield United in 1934. After making no league appearances for the club, he joined Rotherham United. He made 64 appearances and scored 22 goals in the league for them and joined Gainsborough Trinity.
