= Football League Third Division North Cup =

- Organiser(s): Football Association
- Founded: 1933
- Abolished: 1946; 80 years ago
- Region: Northern England; Wales
- Teams: 10
- Last champions: Rotherham United (1st title)
- Most championships: Chester (2 titles)

The Football League Third Division North Cup was a football knockout competition open to teams competing in Football League Third Division North. The competition was first held in 1933–34 and ran until the 1938–39 season. The cup was revived for the 1945–46 season. This was a parallel competition to the Football League Third Division South Cup.

The 1945-46 competition featured the longest competitive match in football history, between Doncaster Rovers and Stockport County at Edgeley Park, Stockport, on the 30th of March. After the first leg at Doncaster was drawn 2-2, the same result occurred at Stockport after the regulation 90 minutes. The game went into extra time, but 30 more minutes were insufficient for a goal to be scored. The game then continued until a goal was scored, like a golden goal. Stockport thought they had clinched the winner on the 173rd minute when Les Cocker put the ball into the back of the net, but their elation was shortlived as it was disallowed by referee Baker.

Finally, after 203 minutes, referee Baker called an end to the match, due to poor light and player exhaustion. Doncaster won the right to host the second replay in a coin toss, winning emphatically with a 4-0 scoreline.

== Format ==
The competition was run using a knockout format, with games replayed if level. In the first year the tournament format resulted in 11 first round ties, followed by 4 second round ties (with three byes), and 3 third round matches (with one bye). In most seasons there were minor changes to the format, resulting in differing numbers of ties (and byes) in each round. The tournaments featured all 22 teams from Division Three North, with the exception of the final season, when only 14 teams played in the competition. The final was played on the home ground of one of the two finalists.

The 1945–46 competition started with two cup competitions, the Third Division North (East) Cup and Third Division North (West) Cup. Each cup consisted of 10 teams played on a league basis, although only 10 games were played by each team. The first 8 places in each cup then contested the first round of a two legged knockout competition.

== Finals ==
The result of each year's final is given in the table below.

Season	Winners	Result	Runner-up	Venue	Att.	Notes
1933–34	Darlington	4–3	Stockport County	Old Trafford	4,640	
1934–35	Stockport County	2–0	Walsall	Maine Road	4,305	
1935–36	Chester City	2–1	Darlington	Feethams	7,820	
1936–37	Chester City	3–1	Southport	Haig Avenue	6,000	
1937–38	Southport	4–1	Bradford City	Haig Avenue	4,642	
1938–39	Bradford City	3–0	Accrington Stanley	Valley Parade	3,117	
1945–46	Rotherham United	3–2	Chester			Replay. First match ended 2–2.

== See also ==
- Football League Third Division South Cup
- Football League Trophy
