= 2008–09 FA Trophy =

FA Challenge Trophy

Tournament details
- Country: England; Wales
- Teams: 263

Final positions
- Champions: Stevenage Borough
- Runners-up: York City

Tournament statistics
- Matches played: 262

The FA Trophy 2008–09 was the fortieth season of the FA Trophy, the Football Association's cup competition for teams at levels 5–8 of the English football league system. The number of team entries for this season was 263.

== Calendar ==
Round	Date	Matches	Clubs	New entries this round	Prize money
Preliminary round	4 October 2008	51	263→212	102	£1,000
First round qualifying	18 October 2008	72	212→140	93	£2,300
Second round qualifying	1 November 2008	36	140→104	none	£3,000
Third round qualifying	22 November 2008	40	104→64	44	£4,000
First round	13 December 2008	32	64→32	24	£5,000
Second round	10 January 2009	16	32→16	none	£6,000
Third round	31 January 2009	8	16→8	none	£7,000
Fourth round	21 February 2009	4	8→4	none	£8,000
Semi-finals	14 March and 21 March 2009	2	4→2	none	£16,000
Final	9 May 2009	1	2 → 1	none	Winner: £50,000 Loser: £25,000

== Preliminary round ==
Ties were played on 4 October 2008.

=== Ties ===
Tie	Home team	Score	Away team	Attendance
1	Trafford	8–1	Rossendale United	121
2	Retford United	1–2	Kidsgrove Athletic	173
3	Clitheroe	4–1	Grantham Town	195
4	Brigg Town	4–0	Willenhall Town	98
5	Durham City	1–1	Curzon Ashton	171
6	Romulus	3–2	Loughborough Dynamo	77
7	Goole	1–1	Nuneaton Town	253
8	Spalding United	2–1	Wakefield	70
9	Lancaster City	1–0	Leek Town	146
10	Rushall Olympic	2–1	Ossett Albion	71
11	Garforth Town	2–0	Belper Town	143
12	Skelmersdale United	2–1	Shepshed Dynamo	164
13	Chorley	0–0	Warrington Town	209
14	Woodley Sports	0–1	Quorn	92
15	Harrogate Railway Athletic	2–1	FC Halifax Town	347
16	Carlton Town	2–1	Atherstone Town	82
17	Sheffield	5–3	Bamber Bridge	242
18	Mossley	1–5	Stocksbridge Park Steels	191
19	Salford City	2–0	Gresley Rovers	113
20	Aveley	2–0	Ilford	84
21	Waltham Forest	1–4	AFC Sudbury	65
22	Wingate & Finchley	2–1	Ware	60
23	Great Wakering Rovers	5–3	Ashford Town	112
24	Northwood	2–0	Whyteleafe	101
25	Merstham	4–1	Arlesey Town	101
26	Metropolitan Police	0–0	Waltham Abbey	81
27	Kingstonian	2–3	Whitstable Town	294
28	Rothwell Town	2–2	Tilbury	66
29	Leatherhead	1–2	Sittingbourne	140
30	Leighton Town	7–1	Chipstead	88
31	Bury Town	2–1	Barton Rovers	214
32	Maldon Town	0–1	Cheshunt	72
33	Crowborough Athletic	3–0	Eastbourne Town	142
34	Folkestone Invicta	1–1	Chatham Town	208
35	Leyton	1–4	Dulwich Hamlet	83
36	Potters Bar Town	0–2	Brentwood Town	84
37	East Thurrock United	2–1	Thamesmead Town	97
38	Concord Rangers	4–1	Woodford United	79
39	Walton Casuals	4–3	Hillingdon Borough	85
40	Godalming Town	1–5	Enfield Town	169
41	Corinthian-Casuals	1–3	Worthing	110
42	Soham Town Rangers	1–0	Redbridge	113
43	Burgess Hill Town	3–1	Dunstable Town	170
44	Bracknell Town	2–0	Malvern Town	68
45	Aylesbury United	2–0	Bridgwater Town	186
46	Didcot Town	1–2	Andover	182
47	Winchester City	3–0	Taunton Town	119
48	Fleet Town	3–1	Beaconsfield SYCOB	98
49	Cinderford Town	2–4	Truro City	116
50	Paulton Rovers	1–1	Thatcham Town	105
51	Marlow	2–0	Cirencester Town	117

=== Replays ===
Tie	Home team	Score	Away team	Attendance
5	Curzon Ashton	1–2	Durham City	147
7	Nuneaton Town	0–1	Goole	258
13	Warrington Town	3–0	Chorley	128
26	Waltham Abbey	1–2	Metropolitan Police	88
28	Tilbury	2–0	Rothwell Town	57
34	Chatham Town	2–0	Folkestone Invicta	154
50	Thatcham Town	2–0	Paulton Rovers	110

== First round qualifying ==
Ties will be played on 18 October 2008.

Teams from Premier Division of Southern League, Northern Premier League and Isthmian League entered in this round.

=== Ties ===
Tie	Home team	Score	Away team	Attendance
1	Romulus	1–1	Garforth Town	81
2	Harrogate Railway Athletic	0–1	Leigh Genesis	129
3	Stourbridge	6–0	Salford City	162
4	Rushall Olympic	0–0	Bedworth United	90
5	Witton Albion	0–1	Worksop Town	219
6	Whitby Town	3–2	Trafford	223
7	Hednesford Town	3–1	Quorn	338
8	Ashton United	2–1	Lincoln United	103
9	Matlock Town	0–1	Warrington Town	242
10	FC United of Manchester	1–0	Radcliffe Borough	1,227
11	Brigg Town	1–5	Marine	131
12	Boston United	6–0	Kidsgrove Athletic	797
13	Skelmersdale United	1–0	Sheffield	201
14	Guiseley	0–1	Ossett Town	272
15	Glapwell	3–2	Leamington	203
16	Colwyn Bay	2–2	Chasetown	268
17	Stocksbridge Park Steels	3–1	Goole	143
18	Lancaster City	3–3	Rugby Town	166
19	Spalding United	0–0	North Ferriby United	154
20	Frickley Athletic	0–2	Nantwich Town	187
21	Prescot Cables	0–3	Cammell Laird	249
22	Stamford	3–0	Kendal Town	210
23	Durham City	4–4	Halesowen Town	202
24	Bradford Park Avenue	1–2	Clitheroe	294
25	Eastwood Town	0–2	Ilkeston Town	504
26	Newcastle Blue Star	2–2	Sutton Coldfield Town	119
27	Buxton	5–3	Carlton Town	302
28	Concord Rangers	3–1	Billericay Town	291
29	Uxbridge	2–1	Walton & Hersham	129
30	Walton Casuals	0–0	Heybridge Swifts	83
31	Whitstable Town	3–4	Brackley Town	170
32	Worthing	2–0	Merstham	318
33	Maidstone United	1–1	AFC Hornchurch	384
34	Crowborough Athletic	0–2	Northwood	87
35	Wingate & Finchley	1–1	Ashford Town (Middx)	80
36	Brentwood Town	2–3	AFC Sudbury	223
37	Wealdstone	1–0	Croydon Athletic	195
38	Bedford Town	1–2	Corby Town	374
39	Hemel Hempstead Town	6–0	AFC Hayes	147
40	Metropolitan Police	0–2	Dulwich Hamlet	111
41	Soham Town Rangers	6–0	Witham Town	127
42	Aveley	1–2	Hitchin Town	108
43	Tilbury	1–1	Cray Wanderers	67
44	Harrow Borough	2–1	Chatham Town	101
45	Staines Town	0–2	Dover Athletic	320
46	Boreham Wood	2–0	Burgess Hill Town	89
47	Tonbridge Angels	2–3	Ramsgate	372
48	Dartford	2–1	Harlow Town	851
49	Bury Town	1–0	Leighton Town	201
50	Enfield Town	0–2	Great Wakering Rovers	208
51	Cambridge City	1–1	Canvey Island	312
52	Cheshunt	1–2	East Thurrock United	125
53	Horsham	4–2	Sittingbourne	199
54	Margate	0–1	Hendon	362
55	Hastings United	3–1	Carshalton Athletic	320
56	Sutton United	2–0	Tooting & Mitcham United	511
57	Tiverton Town	5–2	North Leigh	344
58	Mangotsfield United	0–2	Bashley	134
59	Yate Town	1–1	Stourport Swifts	132
60	Andover	3–2	Gosport Borough	115
61	Banbury United	0–1	Burnham	217
62	Merthyr Tydfil	4–1	Bishop's Cleeve	274
63	Bromsgrove Rovers	1–4	Gloucester City	362
64	Evesham United	4–0	Clevedon Town	110
65	Winchester City	0–5	Windsor & Eton	163
66	Bracknell Town	2–4	Swindon Supermarine	102
67	Farnborough	4–0	Marlow	348
68	Thatcham Town	5–4	Slough Town	177
69	Truro City	3–3	Chesham United	511
70	Oxford City	3–1	Aylesbury United	299
71	AFC Totton	3–2	Abingdon United	111
72	Chippenham Town	2–1	Fleet Town	316

=== Replays ===
Tie	Home team	Score	Away team	Attendance
1	Garforth Town	3–4	Romulus	78
4	Bedworth United	4–1	Rushall Olympic	79
16	Chasetown	2–1	Colwyn Bay	341
18	Rugby Town	2–0	Lancaster City	131
19	North Ferriby United	2–0	Spalding United	89
23	Halesowen Town	0–1	Durham City	311
26	Sutton Coldfield Town	4–1	Newcastle Blue Star	55
30	Heybridge Swifts	3–2	Walton Casuals	94
33	AFC Hornchurch	1–2	Maidstone United	257
35	Ashford Town (Middx)	2–4	Wingate & Finchley	52
43	Cray Wanderers	1–0	Tilbury	78
51	Canvey Island	0–0	Cambridge City	245
	Cambridge City won 4–2 on penalties			
59	Stourport Swifts	1–3	Yate Town	73
69	Chesham United	2–1	Truro City	279

== Second round qualifying ==
Ties will be played on 1 November 2007

=== Ties ===
Tie	Home team	Score	Away team	Attendance
1	Worksop Town	0–3	FC United of Manchester	599
2	Chasetown	1–1	North Ferriby United	377
3	Buxton	0–1	Skelmersdale United	345
4	Ossett Town	1–0	Bedworth United	110
5	Ashton United	0–2	Ilkeston Town	142
6	Clitheroe	2–4	Boston United	359
7	Marine	1–2	Durham City	206
8	Romulus	2–2	Warrington Town	115
9	Stourbridge	2–1	Evesham United	198
10	Leigh Genesis	1–5	Cammell Laird	94
11	Sutton Coldfield Town	2–3	Glapwell	103
12	Rugby Town	1–3	Nantwich Town	238
13	Stamford	3–4	Hednesford Town	245
14	Stocksbridge Park Steels	0–2	Whitby Town	153
15	Swindon Supermarine	2–0	Maidstone United	333
16	Great Wakering Rovers	1–1	AFC Sudbury	130
17	Soham Town Rangers	0–5	Farnborough	188
18	East Thurrock United	4–2	Gloucester City	134
19	Boreham Wood	1–2	Uxbridge	77
20	Northwood	1–4	Brackley Town	115
21	Hendon	1–2	Sutton United	269
22	Harrow Borough	2–3	Hastings United	111
23	Dover Athletic	2–3	Cambridge City	509
24	Heybridge Swifts	0–0	Chippenham Town	169
25	Andover	3–2	Merthyr Tydfil	180
26	Burnham	0–5	Windsor & Eton	181
27	Dulwich Hamlet	0–3	Bury Town	245
28	Dartford	3–3	Oxford City	749
29	Horsham	1–2	Cray Wanderers	158
30	Hitchin Town	3–6	Ramsgate	246
31	Corby Town	2–3	Chesham United	279
32	Yate Town	1–3	Bashley	148
33	Thatcham Town	0–4	AFC Totton	138
34	Concord Rangers	1–3	Hemel Hempstead Town	117
35	Wealdstone	1–2	Tiverton Town	220
36	Wingate & Finchley	1–0	Worthing	100

=== Replays ===
Tie	Home team	Score	Away team	Attendance
2	North Ferriby United	1–4	Chasetown	111
8	Warrington Town	3–1	Romulus	88
16	AFC Sudbury	4–3	Great Wakering Rovers	201
24	Chippenham Town	0–1	Heybridge Swifts	223
28	Oxford City	2–4	Dartford	219

== Third round qualifying ==
Ties will be played on 22 November 2007

Teams from Conference North and Conference South entered in this round.

=== Ties ===
Tie	Home team	Score	Away team	Attendance
1	Hinckley United	1–2	Burscough	251
2	King's Lynn	3–2	Stafford Rangers	749
3	Solihull Moors	1–2	Durham City	196
4	Ossett Town	3–1	Fleetwood Town	151
5	Whitby Town	0–3	Stalybridge Celtic	176
6	Redditch United	1–1	Cammell Laird	200
7	Tamworth	0–1	Workington	433
8	Warrington Town	0–1	Nantwich Town	232
9	FC United of Manchester	1–3	Boston United	936
10	Vauxhall Motors	0–0	Southport	278
11	Chasetown	1–2	Ilkeston Town	471
12	Farsley Celtic	2–0	Droylsden	207
13	Gainsborough Trinity	0–2	AFC Telford United	444
14	Hyde United	1–1	Hednesford Town	275
15	Blyth Spartans	3–4	Alfreton Town	446
16	Stourbridge	3–2	Hucknall Town	176
17	Gateshead	0–2	Harrogate Town	217
18	Glapwell	0–1	Skelmersdale United	169
19	Uxbridge	2–1	Dorchester Town	110
20	Fisher Athletic	1–2	Havant & Waterlooville	170
21	Weston-super-Mare	0–2	AFC Sudbury	218
22	Team Bath	2–1	Windsor & Eton	114
23	Swindon Supermarine	1–0	Bromley	229
24	Braintree Town	1–1	Farnborough	212
25	Basingstoke Town	1–0	Thurrock	202
26	Cambridge City	1–0	Hastings United	302
27	Bath City	5–1	East Thurrock United	359
28	Wingate & Finchley	1–1	Sutton United	149
29	Maidenhead United	2–4	Chesham United	255
30	St Albans City	0–0	Dartford	525
31	Hampton & Richmond Borough	1–2	Bury Town	334
32	Cray Wanderers	0–3	Brackley Town	112
33	Eastleigh	0–2	Bashley	424
34	Andover	0–3	Newport County	264
35	Worcester City	1–3	AFC Wimbledon	895
36	Ramsgate	0–2	Bognor Regis Town	247
37	Hayes & Yeading United	1–0	Chelmsford City	347
38	Welling United	1–1	AFC Totton	309
39	Hemel Hempstead Town	5–1	Heybridge Swifts	168
40	Bishop's Stortford	0–0	Tiverton Town	271

=== Replays ===
Tie	Home team	Score	Away team	Attendance
6	Cammell Laird	0–2	Redditch United	132
10	Southport	2–1	Vauxhall Motors	224
14	Hednesford Town	5–0	Hyde United	263
24	Farnborough	6–2	Braintree Town	321
28	Sutton United	2–2	Wingate & Finchley	212
	Wingate & Finchley won 4–3 on penalties			
30	Dartford	1–1	St Albans City	542
	St Albans City won 4–2 on penalties			
38	AFC Totton	1–2	Welling United	232
40	Tiverton Town	1–0	Bishop's Stortford	290

== First round ==
This round is the first in which Conference Premier teams join those from lower reaches of the National League System.

Ties will be played on 13 December 2008.

=== Ties ===
Tie	Home team	Score	Away team	Attendance
1	Altrincham	1–4	Southport	609
2	Durham City	2–0	Harrogate Town	232
3	Northwich Victoria	0–2	York City	393
4	Wrexham	2–1	Mansfield Town	1,559
5	Hednesford Town	3–2	Nantwich Town	264
6	Burton Albion	1–1	Farsley Celtic	923
7	Ilkeston Town	3–2	Ossett Town	205
8	Barrow	2–1	Skelmersdale United	743
9	Alfreton Town	0–1	Redditch United	192
10	Kidderminster Harriers	3–1	Burscough	685
11	Workington	4–3	King's Lynn	240
12	Stourbridge	1–6	Stalybridge Celtic	148
13	Boston United	1–2	AFC Telford United	895
14	Swindon Supermarine	1–0	Eastbourne Borough	302
15	Stevenage Borough	4–1	St Albans City	737
16	Cambridge City	1–4	Kettering Town	437
17	AFC Sudbury	0–2	Oxford United	434
18	Bashley	2–2	Tiverton Town	165
19	Welling United	2–0	Weymouth	262
20	Histon	2–3	Cambridge United	1,146
21	Forest Green Rovers	5–1	Hemel Hempstead Town	509
22	Bognor Regis Town	0–2	Ebbsfleet United	299
23	Farnborough	3–1	Wingate & Finchley	304
24	Uxbridge	2–1	AFC Wimbledon	582
25	Hayes & Yeading United	2–0	Grays Athletic	158
26	Havant & Waterlooville	3–1	Bury Town	232
27	Torquay United	2–0	Bath City	1,176
28	Woking	1–2	Salisbury City	506
29	Basingstoke Town	3–1	Brackley Town	221
30	Newport County	1–1	Rushden & Diamonds	633
31	Chesham United	2–4	Crawley Town	399
32	Team Bath	1–2	Lewes	206

=== Replays ===
Tie	Home team	Score	Away team	Attendance
6	Farsley Celtic	2–2	Burton Albion	262
	Burton Albion won 3–2 on penalties			
18	Tiverton Town	2–1	Bashley	436
30	Rushden & Diamonds	1–1	Newport County	421
	Rushden & Diamonds won 5–3 on penalties			

== Second round ==
Ties will be played on 10 January 2009.

=== Ties ===
Tie	Home team	Score	Away team	Attendance
1	Lewes	3–3	Havant & Waterlooville	258
2	Ilkeston Town	3–5	Kidderminster Harriers	401
3	Burton Albion	3–0	Salisbury City	1,472
4	Basingstoke Town	1–2	Wrexham	597
5	Hednesford Town	4–3	Welling United	346
6	Forest Green Rovers	5–0	Redditch United	441
7	Tiverton Town	1–1	Kettering Town	604
8	Durham City	1–1	Southport	387
9	AFC Telford United	4–0	Hayes & Yeading United	986
10	Farnborough	0–2	Stevenage Borough	705
11	Torquay United	1–0	Rushden & Diamonds	1,728
12	Ebbsfleet United	2–1	Stalybridge Celtic	467
13	Barrow	0–3	Workington	1,614
14	Uxbridge	1–6	Swindon Supermarine	203
15	Oxford United	1–2	York City	1,958
16	Cambridge United	0–5	Crawley Town	1,233

=== Replays ===
Tie	Home team	Score	Away team	Attendance
1	Havant & Waterlooville	4–3	Lewes	302
7	Kettering Town	1–1	Tiverton Town	816
	Kettering Town won 4-1 on penalties			
8	Southport	3–1	Durham City	553

== Third round ==
Ties will be played on 31 January 2009.

=== Ties ===
Tie	Home team	Score	Away team	Attendance
1	Kettering Town	0–1	AFC Telford United	1,692
2	Kidderminster Harriers	1–1	York City	1,113
3	Workington	1–3	Wrexham	1,029
4	Forest Green Rovers	1–0	Hednesford Town	768
5	Ebbsfleet United	2–0	Swindon Supermarine	3,750
6	Havant & Waterlooville	2–0	Crawley Town	413
7	Southport	3–0	Torquay United	980
8	Stevenage Borough	4–0	Burton Albion	1,296

=== Replays ===
Tie	Home team	Score	Away team	Attendance
2	York City	1–1	Kidderminster Harriers	683
	York City won 13–12 on penalties			

== Fourth round ==
Ties will be played on 21 February 2009.

=== Ties ===
Tie	Home team	Score	Away team	Attendance
1	Wrexham	0–0	Ebbsfleet United	3,021
2	Stevenage Borough	4–0	Forest Green Rovers	1,349
3	AFC Telford United	2–2	Southport	2,059
4	York City	2–0	Havant & Waterlooville	1,679

=== Replays ===
Tie	Home team	Score	Away team	Attendance
1	Ebbsfleet United	3–1	Wrexham	992
3	Southport	0–1	AFC Telford United	

== Semi-finals ==
=== First leg ===
14 March 2009
15:00

Stevenage Borough	3 – 2	Ebbsfleet United
Morison 7'; Boylan 32'; Bridges 81'		Barrett 61'; Long 72'

The Lamex Stadium, Stevenage
Attendance: 2,344

14 March 2009
15:00

AFC Telford United	0 – 2	York City
		Rusk 10'; Purkiss 68'

New Bucks Head, Telford
Attendance: 2,792

=== Second leg ===
21 March 2009
15:00

Ebbsfleet United	0 – 1	Stevenage Borough
		Vincenti 90'

Stonebridge Road, Northfleet
Attendance: 3,008

21 March 2009
15:00

York City	2 – 1	AFC Telford United
Brodie 17'; McBreen 62'		Brown 86'

Bootham Crescent, York
Attendance: 3,512

== Final ==
9 May 2009
14:00

Stevenage Borough	2–0	York City
Morison 69'; Boylan 90'	Report

Wembley Stadium, London
Attendance: 27,102
Referee: Michael Jones
