= Football League Third Division North =

- Organising body: The Football League
- Founded: 1921
- Folded: 1958
- Country: England
- Other club from: Wales
- Number of clubs: 20 (1921–1923); 22 (1923–1950); 24 (1950–1958)
- Level on pyramid: 3
- Promotion to: Second Division
- Domestic cup: FA Cup
- League cup(s): Third Division North Cup (1933–1939, 1945–1946)
- Last champions: Scunthorpe United (1957–58)
- Most championships: Doncaster Rovers, Lincoln City (3 titles)

The Third Division North of the Football League was a tier in the English football league system from 1921 to 1958. It ran in parallel with the Third Division South with clubs elected to the League or relegated from a higher division allocated to one or the other according to geographical position. Some clubs in the English Midlands shuttled between the Third Division North and the Third Division South according to the composition of the two leagues in any one season.

The Third Division South had been created in 1921 from the Third Division formed the previous year made up of 22 teams drawn mostly from the Southern League. It was decided that this gave the Football League overall too much of a southern bias, so the Third Division North was created in 1921–22 to redress the balance. Stockport County had finished bottom of the Second Division at the end of the 1920–21 season, and they were relegated into this new division, where they joined Grimsby Town who had spent a season in the Third Division after relegation from the Second Division in 1919–20. As there was no northern equivalent of the Southern League, the remaining 18 teams came from several regional leagues: the Midland League, the Central League, the North Eastern League, the Lancashire Combination and the Birmingham & District League.

The original 20 teams were: Stockport County, Darlington, Grimsby Town, Hartlepools United, Accrington Stanley, Crewe Alexandra, Stalybridge Celtic, Walsall, Southport, Ashington, Durham City, Wrexham, Chesterfield, Lincoln City, Barrow, Nelson, Wigan Borough, Tranmere Rovers, Halifax Town and Rochdale. The division was extended by a further two teams in 1923 to take the total to 22, and for the 1950–51 season the division was expanded to 24 clubs, with Scunthorpe & Lindsey United and Shrewsbury Town joining.

Only one promotion place was available each season from the Third Division North to the Second Division, which made it very difficult to win promotion. Eight teams, Accrington Stanley, Barrow, Crewe Alexandra, Halifax Town, Hartlepools United, Rochdale, Southport and Wrexham, were ever-present in the division for the 30 years of its existence. Of the teams that played in Third Division North, Wolverhampton Wanderers and Derby County were later English football champions.

Its final season was 1957–58, after which the North and South sections were merged to form a single Third Division and the Fourth Division. The top 12 clubs in Division Three North (except for promoted Champions Scunthorpe United) went into the new Third Division, and the bottom 12 clubs went into the Fourth Division.

== Tournaments between Third Division North and South ==
From 1934 to the outbreak of World War II there was a short-lived knockout competition Football League Third Division North Cup.

From the 1954–55 season until the 1957–58 season, there was a series of games between teams representing the Third Division North and the Third Division South.

== Past champions ==
Season	Champions
1921–22	Stockport County
1922–23	Nelson
1923–24	Wolverhampton Wanderers
1924–25	Darlington
1925–26	Grimsby Town
1926–27	Stoke City
1927–28	Bradford Park Avenue
1928–29	Bradford City
1929–30	Port Vale
1930–31	Chesterfield
1931–32	Lincoln City
1932–33	Hull City
1933–34	Barnsley
1934–35	Doncaster Rovers
1935–36	Chesterfield
1936–37	Stockport County
1937–38	Tranmere Rovers
1938–39	Barnsley
1939–40	League abandoned due to World War II
1940–46	League suspended due to World War II
1946–47	Doncaster Rovers
1947–48	Lincoln City
1948–49	Hull City
1949–50	Doncaster Rovers
1950–51	Rotherham United
1951–52	Lincoln City
1952–53	Oldham Athletic
1953–54	Port Vale
1954–55	Barnsley
1955–56	Grimsby Town
1956–57	Derby County
1957–58	Scunthorpe United

== See also ==
- Football League Third Division South
- Football League Third Division
