= Arthur Bottom =

English footballer

Personal information
- Full name: Arthur Edwin Bottom
- Date of birth: 28 February 1930
- Place of birth: Sheffield, England
- Date of death: 18 April 2012 (aged 82)
- Place of death: Sheffield, England
- Position: Centre forward

Senior career*
Years	Team	Apps	(Gls)
1948–1954	Sheffield United	24	(7)
1954–1958	York City	137	(92)
1958–1959	Newcastle United	11	(10)
1959–1960	Chesterfield	33	(6)
1960–1961	Boston United	?	(?)
1961–1965	Alfreton Town	?	(?)
- * Club domestic league appearances and goals

Arthur Edwin Bottom (28 February 1930 – 18 April 2012) was an English footballer of the 1950s and 1960s. He played as a centre forward, and had a tremendously high goals to game ratio during his career, playing at several clubs; most notably York City and Newcastle United.

== Playing career ==
Bottom's career began with Sheffield YMCA before he joined Sheffield United as a junior.

=== York City ===
In the 1954-55 season, was signed by York City. During his first season he scored 39 cup and league goals, an all-time club record for a single season. Eight of these goals came in York's run to the semi-finals of the FA Cup, including an equaliser in the semi-final against Newcastle United. The match ended 1-1, with Newcastle winning the replay, 2–0. The following season, Bottom scored 33 goals for York. Along with Billy Fenton, he holds the club record for most league goals scored in a season, scoring 31 goals in the league during 1955–56. Bottom is the sixth highest all-time scorer for York City, with a total of 105 goals from 158 appearances for the club.

=== Newcastle United ===
In 1958, Newcastle United signed Bottom from York for a £4,500 transfer fee. He scored seven goals in eight appearances – including two on his debut – for Newcastle that season, helping the club to avoid relegation. The following season, he made only three more appearances (scoring three goals) before he was transferred to Chesterfield for £5,000.

=== Later career ===
Bottom joined Boston United for the 1960-61 season, finishing the season as the club's top scorer with 17 goals. He later played for Alfreton Town in the Midland League.
