= Reg Baines =

English footballer

Personal information
- Date of birth: 3 June 1907
- Place of birth: York, England
- Date of death: 24 October 1974 (aged 67)
- Place of death: Tel Aviv, Israel
- Height: 5 ft 11 in (1.80 m)
- Position: Centre forward

Senior career*
Years	Team	Apps	(Gls)
1924–1926	York City	19	(7)
	Selby Town	?	(?)
	Scarborough	?	(?)
	Selby Town	?	(?)
1931–1933	York City	71	(58)
1933–1934	Sheffield United	10	(5)
1934–1937	Doncaster Rovers	80	(43)
1937–1938	York City	39	(23)
1938–1939	Barnsley	1	(0)
1939	Halifax Town	2	(1)
- * Club domestic league appearances and goals

Reginald E. Baines (3 June 1907 – 21 October 1974) was an English footballer.

Baines started his career with York City whilst the club was playing in the Midland League. He then played for Selby Town and Scarborough, until eventually re-joining York City in September 1931. He scored on his debut in the Football League against Carlisle United, which ended a 1–1 draw.

He was top scorer for Doncaster with 19 goals in 39 games during the 1935–36 season, even though the club finished 18th out of 22 in Division 2.
