= Keith Walwyn =

Kittitian footballer (1956–2003)

Personal information
- Full name: Kenford Keith Ian Walwyn
- Date of birth: 17 February 1956
- Place of birth: Nevis, Saint Kitts and Nevis
- Date of death: 15 April 2003 (aged 47)
- Place of death: Liverpool, England
- Height: 6 ft 1 in (1.85 m)
- Position: Striker

Senior career*
| Years | Team | Apps | (Gls) |
| 1977–1978 | Guiseley | ? | (?) |
| 1979 | Winterton Rangers | ? | (?) |
| 1979–1981 | Chesterfield | 3 | (2) |
| 1981–1987 | York City | 245 | (140) |
| 1987–1989 | Blackpool | 69 | (16) |
| 1989–1991 | Carlisle United | 62 | (15) |
| 1991 | Kettering Town | 7 | (1) |
| Total | | 386 + ? | (174 + ?) |
- * Club domestic league appearances and goals

Kenford Keith Ian Walwyn (17 February 1956 – 15 April 2003) was a Kittitian footballer who played as a striker.

== Career ==
Born in Nevis, Saint Kitts and Nevis, Walwyn had trials for Barnsley and Preston North End before playing for Guiseley from 1977 to 1978. Following a trial with Bradford City he joined Winterton Rangers in 1979 before signing for Chesterfield in November 1979 for a fee of £5,000. He appeared only three times for the club's first team, scoring two goals, despite being a regular scorer in the reserve team. He was signed by York City for a fee of £4,000 in July 1981. During his time with the club, Walwyn played 291 games and scored 140 goals (119 in the league), becoming the club's second all-time top scorer behind Norman Wilkinson. This tally included 25 goals in City's historic 1983–84 Fourth Division championship-winning side. He won the Clubman of the Year trophy for the 1981–82 and 1986–87 seasons.

He was transferred to Blackpool for a transfer tribunal-set fee of £35,000 in July 1987, and scored 16 league goals in 69 appearances for the club. He moved next, in July 1989, to Carlisle United, who would prove to be his last League club. The final club he played for was non-League side Kettering Town, whom he signed for in February 1991. He made seven appearances and scored one goal for Kettering in the Football Conference. He was forced to quit playing in March after he collapsed in a match against Altrincham. He later had a pacemaker fitted.

== Post-football and death ==
After his footballing career ended, Walwyn opened a sports store in the Preston area.

In August 2002, he was guest of honour at the opening of Blackpool's new £7 million West Stand when Blackburn Rovers visited Bloomfield Road.

Walwyn died at 47 years of age, on 15 April 2003 while undergoing a heart operation. He is survived by his wife, Liz, and two children, James and Matthew. His memory lives on at York's Bootham Crescent, where one of the hospitality suites, the "Keith Walwyn Vice presidents' Lounge", bears his name. It was officially opened by his widow in August 2006.

On 7 March 2004, a fundraising match was played at the ground of York featuring a "Past Players Festival". Players from the promotion winning 1983/84 team played the players from the play-off winning side of 1993. Taking Keith Walwyn's place in the squad was Keith's son, Matthew, who went on to score two goals. On 11 May 2008, Matthew was on the bench for Kirkham & Wesham for the FA Vase final at Wembley Stadium against Lowestoft Town. He was introduced in the 79th minute with his team losing 1–0, and subsequently struck an 84th-minute equaliser, and then an injury-time second, to win the game and the trophy for his side.

== Honours ==
York City

- Football League Fourth Division: 1983–84
