= Norman Wilkinson (footballer, born 1931) =

English footballer (1931–2011)

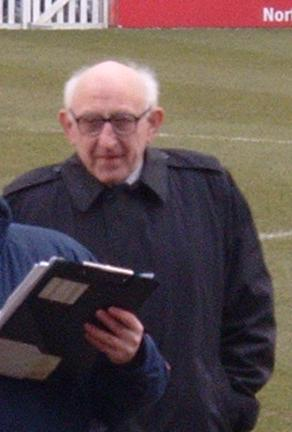
- Wilkinson attending a York City match in 2007

Personal information
- Full name: Norman Francis Wilkinson
- Date of birth: 16 February 1931
- Place of birth: Alnwick, England
- Date of death: 29 January 2011 (aged 79)
- Place of death: Sunderland, England
- Height: 5 ft 11 in (1.80 m)
- Position: Inside forward

Senior career*
Years	Team	Apps	(Gls)
–1952	Crook Town		
1952–1954	Hull City	8	(3)
1954–1966	York City	354	(127)
1966–?	Annfield Plain		
Total		362	(130)
- * Club domestic league appearances and goals

Norman Francis Wilkinson (16 February 1931 – 29 January 2011) was an English professional footballer. He started his career with non-League Crook Town before joining Football League team Hull City in 1953. He joined York City in 1954 and is the club's leading goalscorer with 143 goals. He returned to non-League with Annfield Plain after retiring from League football.

== Career ==
Born in Alnwick, Northumberland, Wilkinson started his career playing in non-League football with Northern League side Crook Town, before joining Hull City of the Second Division as an amateur in November 1952. He made eight appearances and scored three goals in the Football League for Hull in the 1953–54 season. He joined Third Division North team York City for a signing on fee of £10 in May 1954. He scored two goals on his debut in the 6–2 victory against Wrexham on the opening day of the 1954–55 season. He was part of the team that reached the semi-final of the 1954–55 FA Cup, scoring against Scarborough, Dorchester Town and Tottenham Hotspur. Wilkinson is York's highest goalscorer with 143 goals in all competitions. He retired from League football in 1966 but continued on playing non-League football for Annfield Plain and also worked as a scout for York in the North East.

== Personal life ==
During his career, Wilkinson played as a part-timer while also working as a shoe repairer and commuted from his home in north Durham. Before signing for Hull he served in the Royal Air Force. He died in his sleep at the age of seventy-nine on 29 January 2011.

== Style of play ==
Wilkinson played as an inside forward.

== Career statistics ==
Appearances and goals by club, season and competition
Club	Season	League			FA Cup		League Cup		Total	
Club	Season	Division	Apps	Goals	Apps	Goals	Apps	Goals	Apps	Goals
Hull City	1952–53	Second Division	0	0	0	0	—		0	0
Hull City	1953–54	Second Division	8	3	0	0	—		8	3
Hull City	Total		8	3	0	0	—		8	3
York City	1954–55	Third Division North	39	19	8	4	—		47	23
York City	1955–56	Third Division North	27	10	5	1	—		32	11
York City	1956–57	Third Division North	38	17	3	1	—		41	18
York City	1957–58	Third Division North	41	10	5	2	—		46	12
York City	1958–59	Fourth Division	27	9	1	0	—		28	9
York City	1959–60	Third Division	37	14	3	0	—		40	14
York City	1960–61	Fourth Division	35	11	6	4	1	0	42	15
York City	1961–62	Fourth Division	18	3	1	0	4	0	23	3
York City	1962–63	Fourth Division	38	15	4	2	0	0	42	17
York City	1963–64	Fourth Division	27	10	1	2	3	0	31	12
York City	1964–65	Fourth Division	23	9	2	0	0	0	25	9
York City	1965–66	Third Division	4	0	0	0	0	0	4	0
York City	Total		354	127	39	16	8	0	401	143
Career total			362	130	39	16	8	0	409	146
