= 1929–30 York City F.C. season =

Association football club season

York City F.C.
1929–30 season
- Chairman: Arthur Brown
- Manager: Jock Collier
- Ground: Fulfordgate
- Football League Third Division North: 6th
- FA Cup: Third round (eliminated by Newcastle United)
- Top goalscorer: League: Billy Bottrill (18); All: Billy Bottrill; Tom Fenoughty (20)
- Highest home attendance: 12,583 vs Newcastle United, FA Cup, 15 January 1930
- Lowest home attendance: 2,563 vs Hartlepools United, Third Division North, 19 April 1930
- Average home league attendance: 5,279
Home colours

The 1929–30 season was the eighth season of competitive association football and first season in the Football League played by York City Football Club, a professional football club based in York, Yorkshire, England. They finished in sixth position in the 22-team 1929–30 Football League Third Division North. They entered the 1929–30 FA Cup in the first round and lost in the third to Newcastle United.

20 players made at least one appearance in nationally organised first-team competition, and there were 11 different goalscorers. Half-back Ollie Thompson played in all 48 first-team matches over the season. Billy Bottrill and Tom Fenoughty finished as leading goalscorers with 20 goals each. Bottrill scored 18 in league competition and two in the FA Cup, while Fenoughty scored 15 in league competition and five in the FA Cup.

== Match details ==
=== Football League Third Division North ===
Football League Third Division North match details
No.	Date	League position	Opponents	Venue	Result	Score F–A	Scorers	Attendance
1	31 August 1929	1st	Wigan Borough	A	W	2–0	Cowie, Stockill	8,880
2	4 September 1929	4th	Wrexham	H	D	0–0		8,726
3	7 September 1929	5th	Carlisle United	H	D	2–2	Gardner (2)	7,462
4	11 September 1929	7th	Wrexham	A	D	1–1	Davis	6,235
5	14 September 1929	10th	Nelson	A	L	1–3	Cowie	4,483
6	18 September 1929	5th	New Brighton	H	W	1–3	Bottrill (2), Evans	5,422
7	21 September 1929	10th	Southport	H	L	0–4		5,852
8	28 September 1929	9th	Crewe Alexandra	A	D	2–2	Beck, Gardner	5,373
9	5 October 1929	9th	Chesterfield	H	D	1–1	Cowie	4,773
10	12 October 1929	10th	Stockport County	H	L	1–2	Bottrill	6,189
11	19 October 1929	15th	Lincoln City	A	L	0–3		5,310
12	26 October 1929	15th	Tranmere Rovers	H	D	0–0		3,835
13	2 November 1929	14th	Halifax Town	A	D	2–2	Bottrill (2, 1 pen.)	4,656
14	9 November 1929	12th	Rotherham United	H	W	3–0	Fenoughty, Cowie, Millar	3,715
15	23 November 1929	16th	South Shields	H	D	2–2	Gardner (2)	3,608
16	7 December 1929	15th	Darlington	H	D	1–1	Millar	4,892
17	21 December 1929	14th	Doncaster Rovers	H	D	2–2	Gardner, opposition o.g.	2,654'
18	25 December 1929	14th	Barrow	A	D	0–0		2,229
19	26 December 1929	11th	Barrow	H	W	3–1	Evans, Fenoughty, Bottrill	7,834
20	28 December 1929	9th	Wigan Borough	H	W	4–0	Bottrill (3), Gardner	4,395
21	1 January 1930	8th	New Brighton	A	D	1–1	Fenoughty	5,440
22	4 January 1930	8th	Carlisle United	A	D	2–2	Fenoughty, Bottrill	7,149
23	18 January 1930	6th	Nelson	H	W	1–0	Bottrill	5,289
24	25 January 1930	12th	Southport	A	L	0–1		3,375
25	1 February 1930	8th	Crewe Alexandra	H	W	4–2	Millar (3), Bottrill	4,631
26	8 February 1930	11th	Chesterfield	A	L	0–3		4,830
27	15 February 1930	10th	Stockport County	A	W	3–2	Beck, Gardner, Fenoughty	9,434
28	22 February 1930	6th	Lincoln City	H	W	1–0	Gardner	5,298
29	1 March 1930	8th	Tranmere Rovers	A	D	4–4	Gardner, Fenoughty, Millar, Bottrill	4,079
30	5 March 1930	5th	Accrington Stanley	A	D	1–1	Evans	2,017
31	8 March 1930	5th	Halifax Town	H	W	3–0	Evans, Fenoughty, Millar	4,355
32	15 March 1930	5th	Rotherham United	A	W	5–2	Fenoughty (2), Bottrill (2), Gardner	2,259
33	22 March 1930	4th	Rochdale	H	W	6–0	Gardner (2), Fenoughty (2), Millar, Bottril	4,720
34	29 March 1930	5th	South Shields	A	L	1–4	Fenoughty	2,234
35	2 April 1930	5th	Hartlepools United	A	L	1–3	Aitken	4,390
36	5 April 1930	5th	Accrington Stanley	H	W	2–0	Sharpe, Fenoughty	4,529
37	12 April 1930	6th	Darlington	A	L	2–5	Beck pen., Millar	6,028
38	18 April 1930	7th	Port Vale	A	D	1–1	Gardner	15,346
39	19 April 1930	5th	Hartlepools United	H	W	4–1	Evans (2), Gardner, Bottrill	2,563
40	21 April 1930	6th	Port Vale	H	L	0–2		10,120
41	26 April 1930	6th	Doncaster Rovers	A	W	3–0	Fenoughty (2), Evans	4,322
42	3 May 1930	6th	Rochdale	A	L	2–4	Gardner, Bottrill	1,564

=== League table (part) ===
Final Football League Third Division North table (part)
Pos	Club	Pld	W	D	L	F	A	GA	Pts
4th	Chesterfield	42	22	6	14	76	56	1.36	50
5th	Lincoln City	42	17	14	11	83	61	1.36	48
6th	York City	42	15	16	11	77	64	1.20	46
7th	South Shields	42	18	10	14	77	74	1.04	46
8th	Hartlepools United	42	17	11	14	81	74	1.09	45
Key	Pos = League position; Pld = Matches played; W = Matches won; D = Matches drawn; L = Matches lost; F = Goals for; A = Goals against; GA = Goal average; Pts = Points								
Source									

=== FA Cup ===
FA Cup match details
Round	Date	Opponents	Venue	Result	Score F–A	Scorers	Attendance
Fourth qualifying round	16 November 1929	Scarborough	A	W	3–1	Bottrill (2), Cowie	8,089
First round	30 November 1929	Tranmere Rovers	H	D	2–2	Fenoughty (2)	5,580
First round replay	5 December 1929	Tranmere Rovers	A	W	1–0	Fenoughty	4,882
Second round	14 December 1929	Southend United	A	W	4–1	Davis, Gardner, Fenoughty (2)	11,000
Third round	11 January 1930	Newcastle United	A	D	1–1	Gardner	38,674
Third round replay	15 January 1930	Newcastle United	H	L	1–2	Evans	12,583

== Appearances and goals ==
Players with names struck through and marked † left the club during the playing season.
Key to positions: GK – Goalkeeper; FB – Full back; HB – Half back; FW – Forward

Players having played at least one first-team match
Pos.	Nat.	Name	League		FA Cup		Total	
Pos.	Nat.	Name	Apps	Goals	Apps	Goals	Apps	Goals
GK	ENG	Jack Farmery	38	0	6	0	44	0
GK	ENG	Ralph Ridley	4	0	0	0	4	0
FB	SCO	David Archibald	17	0	0	0	17	0
FB	ENG	Jack Brooks	30	0	6	0	36	0
FB	ENG	Sam Johnson	37	0	6	0	43	0
HB	ENG	Harry Beck	41	3	6	0	47	3
HB	ENG	Charlie Davis	41	1	6	1	47	2
HB	ENG	Ollie Thompson	42	0	6	0	48	0
FW	SCO	James Aitken	4	1	0	0	4	1
FW	ENG	Billy Bottrill	39	18	6	2	45	20
FW	SCO	Jimmy Cowie	14	4	3	1	17	5
FW	SCO	Sam Evans	37	7	6	1	43	8
FW	ENG	Tom Fenoughty	29	15	6	5	34	20
FW	SCO	~~Sam Gallacher~~ †	3	0	0	0	3	0
FW	ENG	Bill Gardner	31	16	3	2	34	18
FW	ENG	~~Syd Glidden~~ †	2	0	0	0	2	0
FW	SCO	Willie Millar	37	9	5	0	42	9
FW	ENG	George Sharpe	7	1	0	0	7	1
FW	ENG	Tom Smiles	8	0	0	0	8	0
FW	ENG	Reg Stockill	1	1	1	0	2	1

== See also ==
- List of York City F.C. seasons
