= History of Wigan Athletic F.C. =

History of an English football club

Wigan Athletic's final league position in every season since their election to The Football League in 1978

The history of Wigan Athletic Football Club starts in 1932, when the club were founded. They were elected to The Football League in 1978, and reached the Premier League for the first time in 2005, spending eight years in the top flight. Their first major honour was victory in the 2013 FA Cup Final, the same year they were relegated from the Premiership. Since then the club has bounced between the EFL Championship and League One, sometimes partly due to financial difficulties.

== Earlier clubs and local leagues (1932–1978) ==
Wigan Athletic was formed in 1932, following the winding up of Wigan Borough the previous year. Wigan Athletic is a stable association football club in the town. The first was Wigan Association Football Club, founded in 1883 as an offshoot of Wigan Cricket Club, and a member of the short-lived British Football Association, playing at Prescott Street. They were followed by Wigan County, Wigan United, Wigan Town and Wigan Borough. Springfield Park, the former home of Wigan Borough, was purchased by the club for £2,850. Despite their initial application being turned down, Wigan Athletic were elected into the Cheshire County League following the resignation of Manchester Central. The club had also made the first of many attempts to be admitted into the Football League, but failed to receive a single vote. On 27 August 1932, Wigan Athletic played their first ever league game against Port Vale Reserves. The team played in red and white shirts with black shorts.

Wigan Athletic won their first honours in the 1933–34 season, finishing as champions of the Cheshire League. In the following season, the club won a second league championship and also entered the FA Cup for the first time, defeating Carlisle United 6–1 in the first round – a cup record for the biggest victory by a non-league club over a league club. In the 1935–36 season, the club won its third consecutive Cheshire League title and the Lancashire Junior Cup.

After the Second World War, Wigan Athletic adopted their more familiar blue and white strip. The club struggled to assemble a competitive side, and finished bottom of the league in 1946–47 season. Despite their pre-war success, the club failed to gain re-election and were replaced by Winsford United. The club joined the Lancashire Combination, winning the league in their first season. In 1950, Wigan Athletic came close to election to The Football League, narrowly losing out to Scunthorpe United and Shrewsbury Town. In the 1953–54 season, Wigan played an FA Cup match against Hereford United in front of a crowd of 27,526 – a club record and also a record attendance for a match between two non-league teams at a non-league ground. In the next round of the cup, Wigan Athletic were drawn against First Division side Newcastle United. Wigan Athletic held their top flight opponents to a 2–2 draw at St James' Park, but went on to lose the replay 3–2. In 1961, the club moved back to the Cheshire League.

In the 1964–65 season, Wigan Athletic won their first Cheshire League title since returning to the league, with top goalscorer Harry Lyon scoring 66 times. During the following season, Lyon, who would ultimately become Wigan Athletic's all-time leading goalscorer, was notable for his role in an FA Cup tie against Doncaster Rovers. In the 18th minute of the match, Lyon was stretchered off after tearing his ankle ligaments, but after receiving treatment (including reportedly drinking a small amount of whisky) he returned to the field later in the first half with his ankle heavily strapped. Lyon went on to score a hat-trick in the second half of the game in their 3–1 win. In 1968, Wigan Athletic were founder members of the Northern Premier League. Winning the league title in 1970–71, leading goalscorer with 42 goals, including 7 hat-tricks, was Geoff Davies who scored 28 goals in the following 1971–72 season. After 34 failed election attempts, including one controversial but headline-making application in 1972 to join the Scottish League Second Division, Wigan Athletic were elected to the Football League in 1978.

The first floodlit match played at Springfield Park was on 19 October 1966, when Wigan Athletic played Crewe Alexandra, with the official opening of the floodlights on 24 October, when Manchester City were the visitors. City brought a full strength team to Springfield Park and won 4–0.

The 1973 FA Trophy Final was Wigan's first match at Wembley Stadium, and it lost 2–1 to Scarborough.

== Early league years: 1978–1995 ==
Wigan Athletic's original league kit

Wigan Athletic finished in second place in the Northern Premier League in the 1977–78 season, behind winners Boston United. But as Boston's ground and facilities did not meet the Football League criteria for a League club, whereas Springfield Park did, Wigan Athletic were put forward for election to the league. There was no automatic promotion to the Football League until 1987, and at that time a club had to be 'voted out' of the League to allow a non-league team to be promoted in their place. At the end of the 1977–78 season, Southport finished next to bottom of the old Fourth Division, and faced off with Wigan Athletic for their place in the League. The first round of voting was tied, with both clubs receiving 26 votes. After a tense re-vote which Wigan controversially won 29–20, Southport lost their place in the Fourth Division and Wigan Athletic became an English League club on 2 June 1978.

In the club's first season of League football, Wigan Athletic finished in sixth place, just six points off promotion and playing in front of an average crowd of 6,701. Two more top-half finishes came in the following seasons, though a relatively weak 1980–81 season saw the dismissal of long-serving manager Ian McNeill shortly before the end of the season. They gained their first Football League promotion under the management of former Liverpool player Larry Lloyd in 1981–82, when a points tally of 91 saw them join the former Division Three for the first time, beginning a 10-year spell in English football's third tier. The club struggled in their first season in Division Three, which led to Lloyd's controversial sacking in early 1983, at which point Bobby Charlton, a director at the time, took over as temporary manager before being replaced by Harry McNally. Under McNally's management, the club stabilised in Division Three and secured a pair of mid-table finishes, but a dreadful 1984–85 season cost him his job, with Tranmere manager Bryan Hamilton stepping into the breach. Under Hamilton's management, the club's performances went to the next level and they won their first silverware as a League club that season with the Freight Rover Trophy. They were beaten in the Northern Final of the same competition the following season by Bolton Wanderers. More importantly, Hamilton achieved Division Three survival, which had looked an impossible task earlier that season.

The 1985–86 season saw a marked improvement in the club's league form, eventually finishing in fourth position, a then-club record high which would stand for 17 years until 2002–03. Wigan Athletic finished the season just one point outside the promotion places in the final season before the Football League introduced the play-off system for promotion and relegation. However, Hamilton's feats attracted the attention of First Division Leicester City and he left to become their manager in the summer 1986. His assistant, Ray Mathias, who had followed him from Tranmere, stepped up to the Wigan Athletic manager's job. Wigan Athletic managed an identical fourth-place finish in the 1986–87 season, but this time were rewarded with the chance to compete for the final promotion place in the new play-off system. (In the first two years of the play-off system, teams finishing 3rd, 4th and 5th joined the team finishing 20th in the division above to play-off for the promotion place; this was changed to the teams finishing 3rd, 4th, 5th and 6th from the 1988–89 season). The Latics lost at the two-legged semi-final stage to Swindon, who went on to win the final promotion place.

The fourth-place finishes of the 1985–86 and 1986–87 seasons proved to be the high points of Wigan Athletic's first stint in Division 3. For the next five years, they finished mid-table, flirting with relegation in 1988–89 (at which time Mathias was sacked and previous manager Bryan Hamilton returned) and 1989–90, until they were relegated for the first time in the club's League history in 1992–93. Wigan Athletic finished in 23rd place, amid tumbling attendances which had fallen from averages of 3,000–4,000 in Wigan Athletic's Division 3 years to just 2,593 in 1992–93. Hamilton resigned shortly before the club were relegated, and was replaced by Kenny Swain. A year later, with the club back in the fourth tier of the English League, the Latics finished fourth from bottom, in 19th place. While there was no relegation that season due to the lack of a promotable club in the Football Conference, this remains the club's lowest-ever finish. The following season would prove to be arguably even worse, as Swain was sacked early in the campaign following a horrific start, and former player Graham Barrow took over as manager. Despite the club being rooted to the bottom of the table until the start of December, the second half of the campaign saw a major upturn in form, and they finished well clear of the relegation zone in 15th place. Attendances fell to a lowest-ever Wigan Athletic League average of 1,845 by 1995.

== Rising through the league: 1995–2005 ==
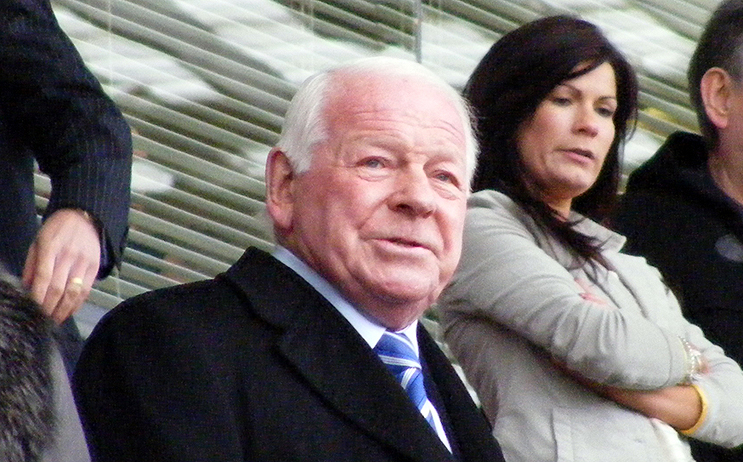
Local entrepreneur Dave Whelan acquired the club in 1995, providing funds to move into the JJB Stadium, later named the DW Stadium after Whelan's sports shops, DW Sports.

In February 1995, local millionaire and owner of JJB Sports, Dave Whelan purchased the club. Through Whelan's business connections in Spain he attracted three Spaniards to the club – Roberto Martínez, Isidro Díaz, and Jesús Seba – who became known as 'The Three Amigos'. The trio became the on-pitch symbols of Whelan's ambitious plan to take Wigan Athletic into the Premier League. 'The Three Amigos' were joined at the club by John Deehan, who replaced Barrow as manager during the 1995–96 season following a 6–2 home defeat to Mansfield Town. Deehan took the Latics within two points of a play-off place in his first season; the club had in fact been in the final automatic promotion spot with four games remaining, but lost them all and so failed to even make the play-offs. The following year Wigan Athletic became Division Three champions on the last day of the season, Graeme Jones scoring a club record 31 league goals in the process. In most seasons they would have been runners-up, but a temporary rule change which saw goals scored take precedence over goal difference allowed them to finish above runners-up Fulham, who had the same number of points and a better goal difference.

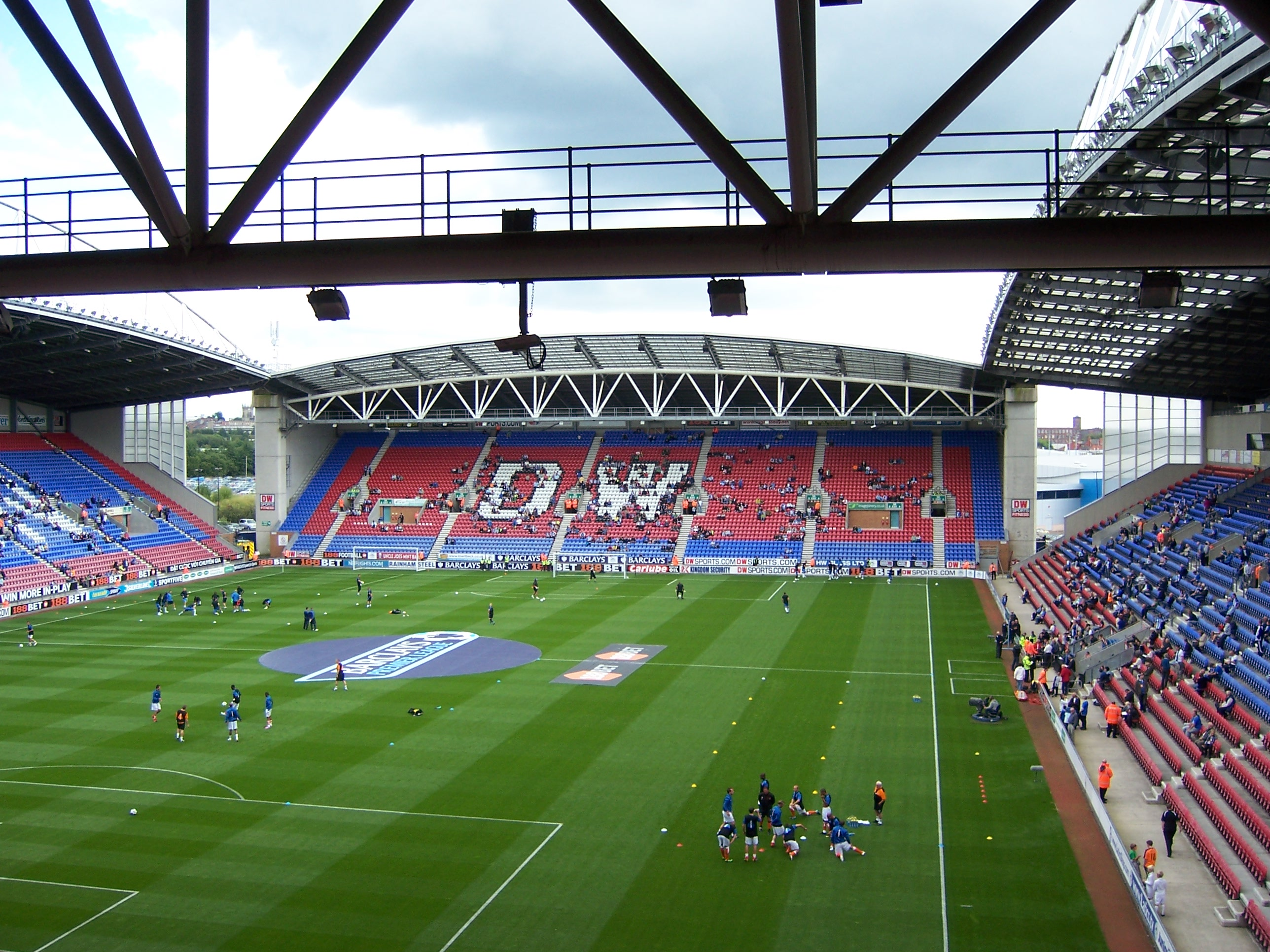
Wigan moved into the DW Stadium (then named the JJB Stadium) in 1999

Following a mid-table finish in Division Two the following season, Deehan quit to become Steve Bruce's assistant at Sheffield United. He was succeeded by Ray Mathias, who returned for his third stint as Wigan Athletic manager. Mathias' team won the Football League Trophy in 1999, beating Millwall 1–0 at Wembley Stadium. The same season the Latics reached the Division Two play-offs, losing 2–1 on aggregate to Manchester City. Mathias was sacked, and replaced by John Benson. He led the team to the top of Division Two in his first six months, but they were only able to qualify for the play-offs. In what was the last ever Division Two play-off final to be played at the old Wembley Stadium, Wigan lost 3–2 after extra time to Gillingham

Benson moved 'upstairs' to the new post of Director of Football in the summer of 2000, when former Arsenal manager Bruce Rioch took the manager's job for the 2000–01 season. Rioch was hampered by severe injury problems and after a difficult and often unimpressive first half of the season left the club in February 2001. He was temporarily replaced by club stalwart Colin Greenall, before the surprise appointment of Steve Bruce for the final eight games of the season. His arrival brought renewed vigour to Wigan Athletic performances, but the club ultimately lost in the play-offs again, this time against Reading. Following this blow, Bruce left for Crystal Palace after repeatedly pledging his future to Wigan Athletic, leaving behind a club both grateful for his help in getting so close to promotion and also angry and bitter at his betrayal.

In the summer of 2001, highly regarded young manager and former Latics forward Paul Jewell took over as manager following an unsuccessful spell at Sheffield Wednesday. His first season in charge saw mixed results and an embarrassing defeat to non-league Canvey Island in the FA Cup first round, although the club eventually finished in mid-table. Jewell's second season in charge was far more successful. Wigan Athletic went on a run to the quarter-finals of the League Cup, beating Premier League opponents West Brom, Manchester City and Fulham en route. Wigan Athletic won the Division Two championship in 2002–03 with a points total of 100, powered by the goals of then-record £1.2 million signing Nathan Ellington, with a run of 10 consecutive wins along the way. The club lost only four times all season, and Wigan Athletic secured promotion to the second tier of the English Football League for the first time in their history.

After losing their first ever game in Division One, Wigan Athletic confounded expectations to go unbeaten for the next 17 games and sit atop the division by November 2003. A weak finish saw Wigan Athletic win only three of their last 10 games to finish seventh in Division One – a last minute goal by West Ham's Brian Deane in the final game of the season saw the Latics drop out of the play-off places in favour of eventual play-off winners Crystal Palace.

Hoping to build on the previous season's disappointing finish, the Latics went one better than 2003–04 by remaining unbeaten for the first 17 games of the 2004–05 season. Along with Sunderland and Ipswich, the Latics remained in the promotion hunt all season. By the last day of the season, Sunderland had already won the title and Wigan needed at least a draw against Reading – who themselves needed to win to finish in sixth place – to beat Ipswich to the last automatic promotion spot. A 3–1 victory in front of their home fans at the JJB Stadium earned Wigan Athletic promotion to the top division of the English football for the first time in their 73-year history.

== Premier League seasons: 2005–2013 ==
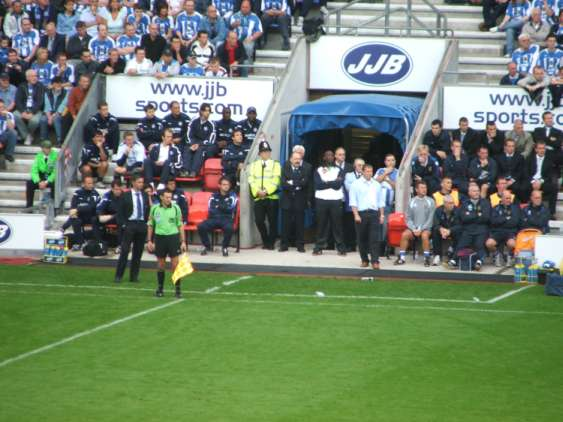
Wigan Athletic's first Premier League match against Chelsea

The club's first Premier League game was a home match against champions Chelsea, lost 1–0 after an injury-time goal by Hernán Crespo. A successful run followed, and by November, Wigan were second in the league. Good league form was coupled with an equally strong performance in the Football League Cup, with Wigan reaching their first ever major cup final after defeating Arsenal on away goals in the semi-final. In the final, Wigan were defeated 4–0 by neighbours Manchester United. Wigan Athletic eventually finished the 2005–06 season in 10th place, which remains the club's highest ever league finish. Defender Pascal Chimbonda was also included in the 2005–06 PFA Team of the Season, capping off his season by being picked for the France squad for the 2006 FIFA World Cup. Wigan opted not to take part in the UEFA Intertoto Cup.

During the close season, Wigan sold many who had starred in their first season in the Premier League, as Jimmy Bullard left for Fulham, Jason Roberts joined Blackburn Rovers, and Stéphane Henchoz was released. Wigan brought in international replacements including Emile Heskey, Denny Landzaat, Chris Kirkland and Antonio Valencia. After a mid-table start to the 2006–07 season, Wigan had eight consecutive losses from mid-December, but then were 15th in early March. But a series of defeats and the resurgence of rival strugglers meant Wigan faced the threat of relegation. On the final day of the season, Wigan got a 2–1 away win against Sheffield United, which kept them up at the expense of their opponents. The following day, Paul Jewell unexpectedly resigned as manager; his assistant Chris Hutchings was appointed as his replacement.

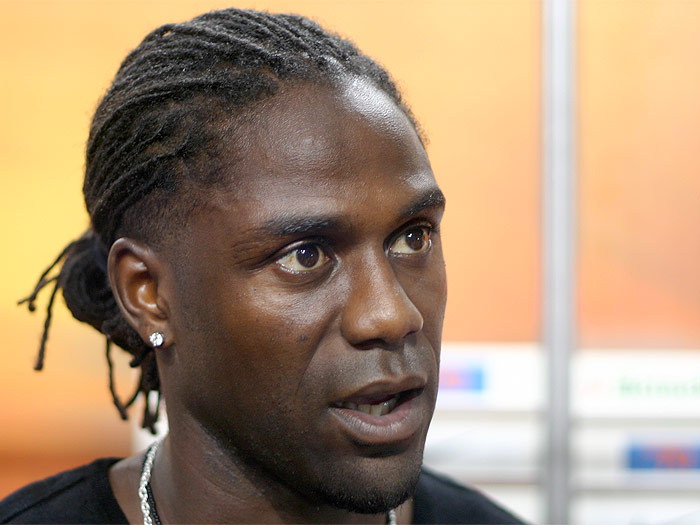
Netherlands international full-back Mario Melchiot became Wigan captain on signing in 2007

Wigan's playing squad had changed almost entirely from the promotion-winning side. Ageing players Arjan De Zeeuw, Matt Jackson, John Filan made way, along with Lee McCulloch, who sealed his dream move to Rangers. Leighton Baines also rejected a new contract and signed for his boyhood team Everton. Titus Bramble, Mario Melchiot, Jason Koumas (for £5.3 million) and much-travelled striker Marcus Bent were among the players brought in. Melchiot was installed as the new club captain. For the new season, Wigan Athletic's home shirt returned to the club's traditional blue and white stripes, having been blue with white sleeves.

The 2007–08 season began well, with Wigan topping the Premier League after three games for the first time in their history. Wigan's strong start saw Emile Heskey recalled to the England squad. He became the first Wigan player to represent England whilst a full member of the squad (Chris Kirkland had earned his first cap while at Wigan, but was on loan from Liverpool at the time). However, Heskey broke his foot immediately after his England call-up, and was out injured for six weeks. The club's league position subsequently worsened, and on the back of a run of six consecutive defeats Wigan fell into the relegation zone. Chairman Dave Whelan took the decision to sack manager Chris Hutchings on 5 November 2007, after only 12 games in charge.

Steve Bruce returned to Wigan as Hutchings' replacement. Bruce had just resigned as Birmingham City manager, and signed a £2 million-a-year deal to try to keep Wigan Athletic in the Premier League. The club had to pay a reported £3 million in compensation to Birmingham for Bruce's services. His appointment saw Wigan end their losing streak, but consistency evaded them, although Bruce did soon achieve something neither Jewell nor Hutchings had managed previously – a 1–1 draw at Anfield against Liverpool; the first time Wigan Athletic had taken points off one of the so-called "Big Four" Premier League clubs. Bruce eventually oversaw a comparatively comfortable end to the season for Wigan, who finished 14th in the final table with 40 points – three places and two points higher than their finish the previous season.

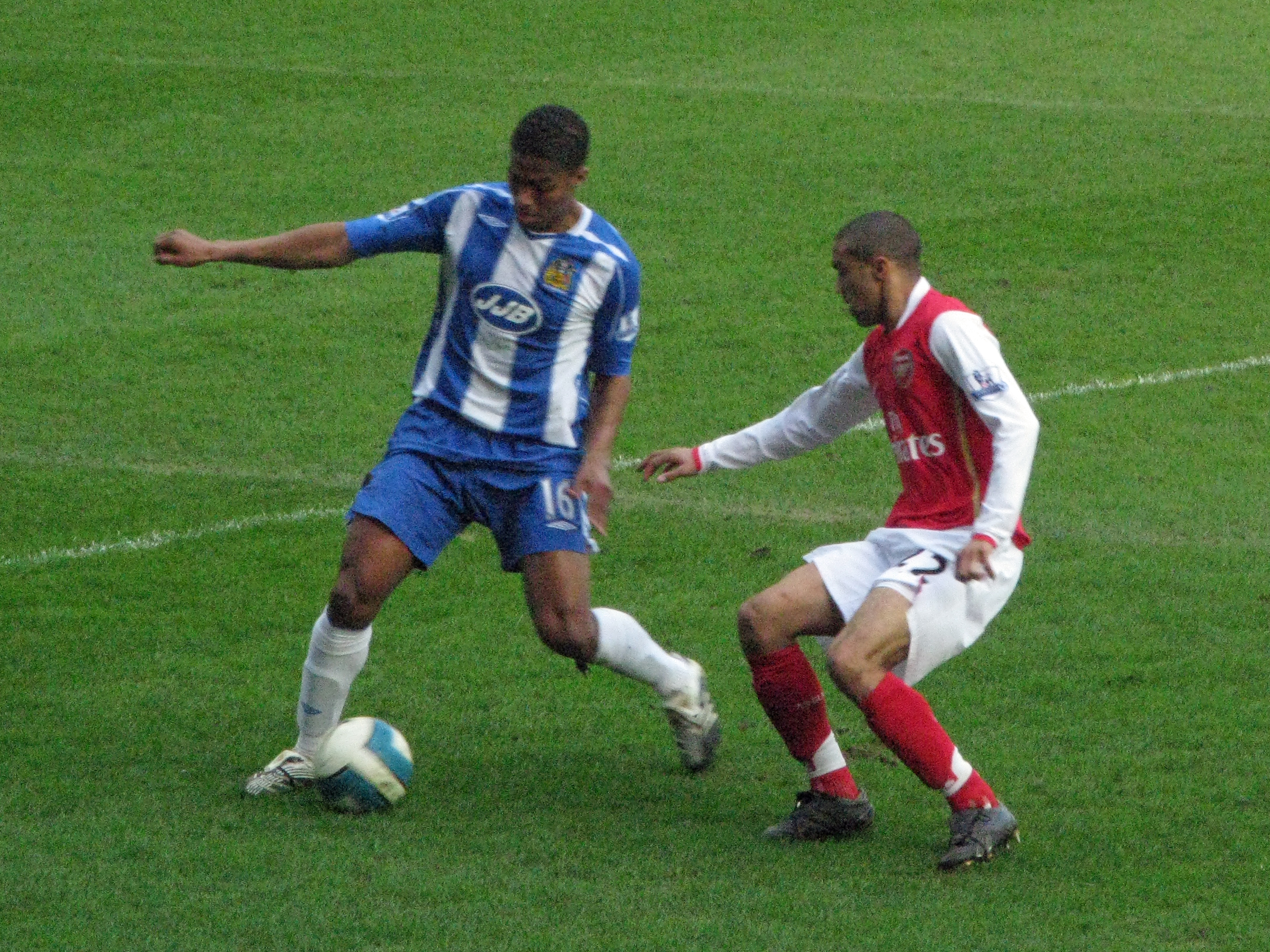
In 2009, Antonio Valencia was sold to Manchester United for £16 million, the largest transfer involving Wigan

In the summer of 2008, the team's kits were altered for the new season in part due to the club signing a new contract with Champion Sportswear. In Bruce's first pre-season with the club, his overhaul of the playing squad continued. The two biggest deals saw Lee Cattermole sign from Middlesbrough for £3.5 million, and highly rated Egyptian striker Amr Zaki sign on an initial one-year loan. Zaki had scored 10 Premier League goals by February 2009, as Wigan reached seventh place in the table with 34 points from 25 games and looked certain to remain in the Premier League for a fifth successive season.

January saw the departure of two key first team members, Wilson Palacios and Emile Heskey, to Tottenham and Aston Villa respectively. Despite these changes, Wigan Athletic finished the season in 11th place with 45 points, their second-best finish ever in the Premier League. On 3 June, Bruce left Wigan for the second time to take over the vacant manager position at Sunderland. July saw the departure of another key first team member, Antonio Valencia to Manchester United. His £16 million transfer is the largest deal involving Wigan. Before the 2009–10 season got underway, Wigan midfielder Lee Cattermole left the club and signed for Sunderland, rejoining Bruce in the process.

=== Roberto Martínez era: 2009–2013 ===
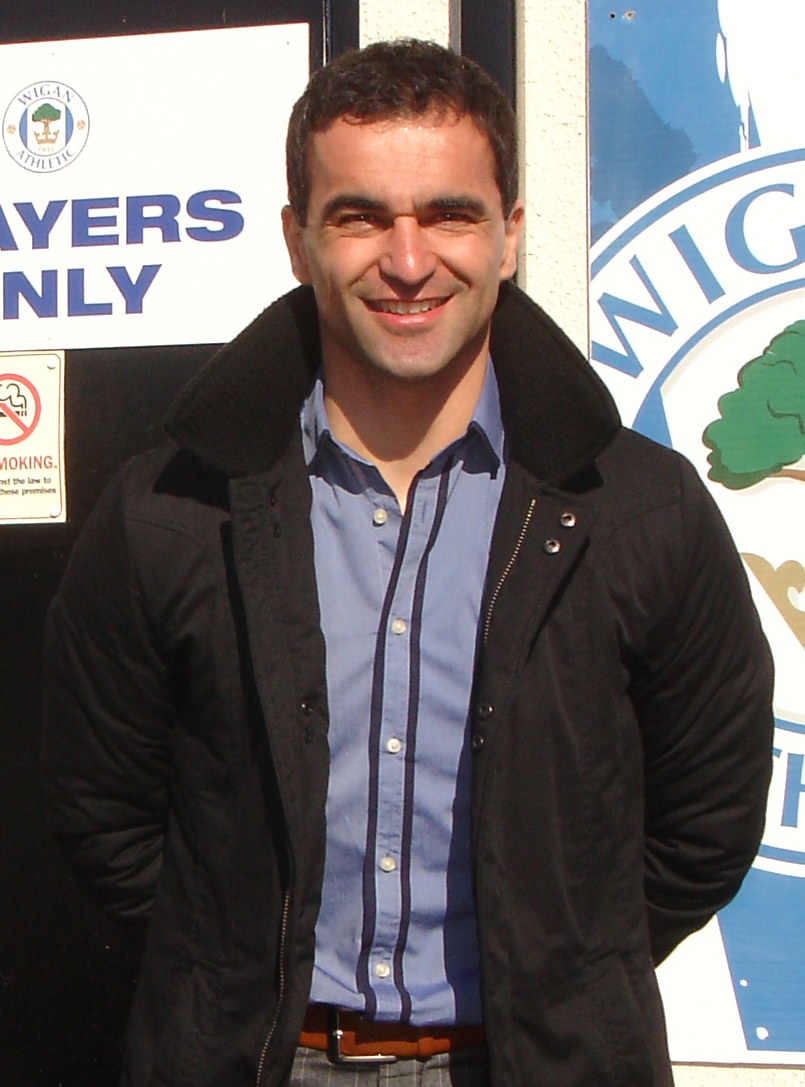
Former Wigan player Roberto Martínez managed the club to victory in the 2013 FA Cup Final, their first major honour.

Wigan appointed Roberto Martínez, then manager of Swansea City, as manager prior to the 2009–10 Premier League season. He previously played for Wigan from 1995 to 2001. On 15 August 2009, Wigan won their opening game of the season, beating Aston Villa away, 2–0 The good form did not continue though, losing the next three games to Wolverhampton Wanderers, Manchester United and Everton before defeating West Ham United at the DW Stadium on 12 September 1–0 to claim three points. The winning run was short-lived, however, with a trip to Arsenal on 19 September ending in a 4–0 defeat. On 26 September Wigan claimed their first win against a "Big 4" team after beating Chelsea 3–1, with goals from Titus Bramble, Hugo Rodallega and Paul Scharner.

On 22 November 2009, Tottenham Hotspur beat Wigan 9–1 at White Hart Lane, with 8 Tottenham goals coming in the second half. This was the first time a Premier League club had conceded nine goals since Manchester United beat Ipswich 9–0 at Old Trafford in 1995. The defeat remains Wigan's largest as a league club.

A late surge that included a 1–0 win over Liverpool and a 3–2 win over Arsenal – the latter of which saw Wigan recover from two goals down with ten minutes remaining to win in injury time – saw the team again survive relegation. Most notably, having never defeated any of the traditional "Big Four" in the league until their win over Chelsea (and with only one win over any of them in cup competitions), Wigan ended the 2009–10 season having defeated three of them at home.

At the beginning of the 2010–11 season, Wigan lost 4–0 to newly promoted Blackpool at the DW stadium, and a 6–0 thrashing at the DW stadium by Chelsea followed. Wigan fell to the bottom of the league by the end of February, following a 4–0 defeat to Manchester United. However, despite remaining in the bottom three for the majority of the season, Wigan Athletic managed to retain their Premier League status on the last day of the 2010-11 season, defeating Stoke City at the Britannia Stadium after a goal from Hugo Rodallega. On 7 May, Wigan Athletic simultaneously secured their Premier League status and relegated Blackburn Rovers with a 1–0 victory at Ewood Park.

On 20 February 2012, the club announced a financial loss of £7.2 million. On 31 December 2012 the club reported a net profit of £4.3 million, the first profit in six years. The biggest expense at the club was wages, which has fallen from £39.9 million to £37.7 million, with turnover at the club increasing from £50.5 million to £52.6 million

After beating Everton in the quarter-final and Millwall in the semi-final, Wigan reached the FA Cup Final, for the first time in their history. In the Final at Wembley Stadium, Wigan beat Manchester City 1–0, with a goal by Ben Watson scored in injury time. Wigan's first major trophy also gave the club a place in the group stage of the Europa League. Following their 4–1 defeat to Arsenal three days later, Wigan Athletic ended their eight-year spell in the Premier League, becoming the first team to be relegated and to win the FA Cup in the same season.

It was announced on 28 May that Martínez had been given reluctant permission to speak to another club. On 5 June Martínez left Wigan and signed for Everton on a four-year deal.

== Recent history: 2013–present ==
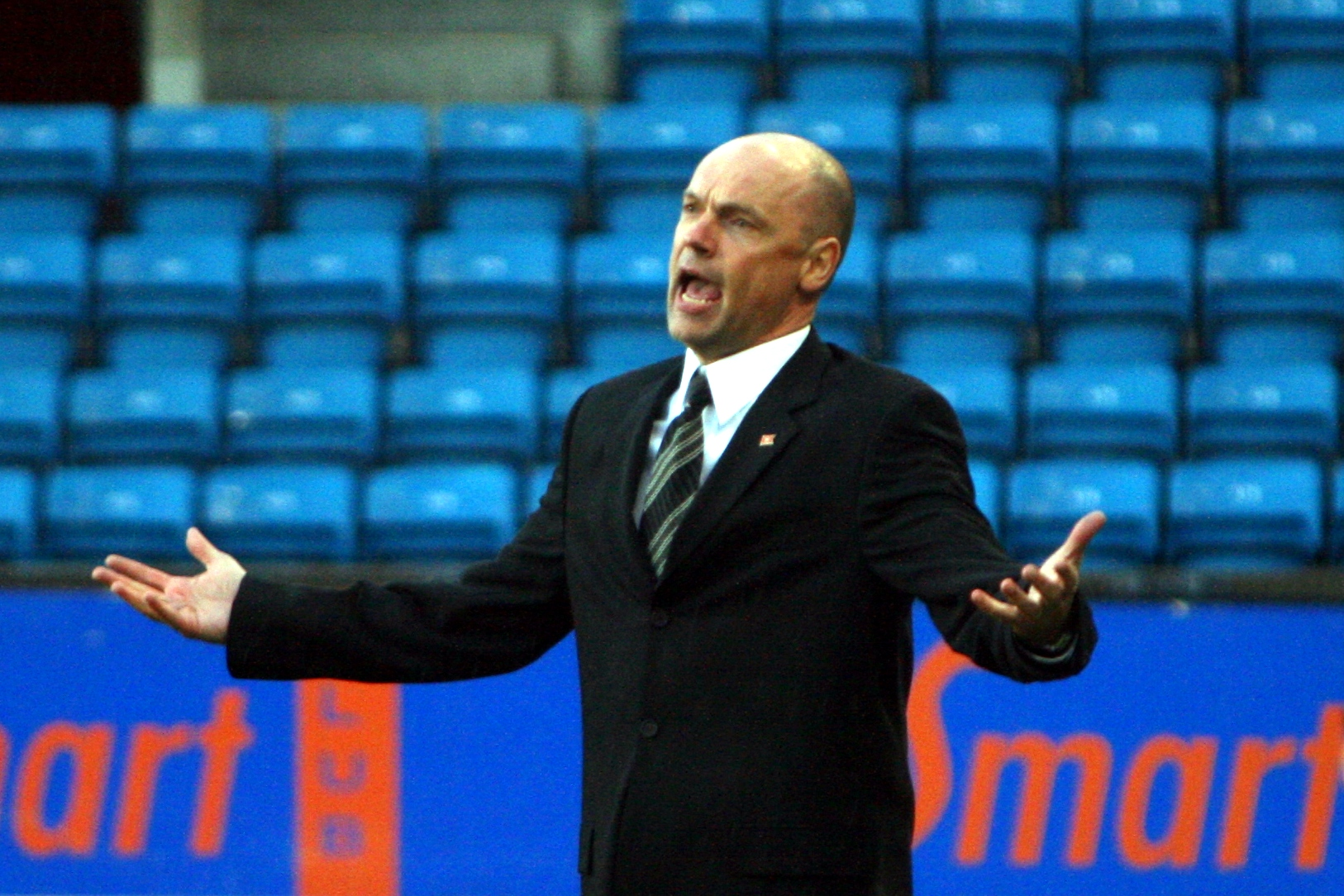
Uwe Rösler was the manager of Wigan Athletic from December 2013 to November 2014

On 14 June 2013, Dave Whelan revealed that a deal had been agreed with Owen Coyle to become the new Wigan manager. He won his first game away at Barnsley before being defeated by Manchester United in the Community Shield. On 19 September, the club played their first game in European competition: a 0–0 away draw to Zulte Waregem in the UEFA Europa League group stage. Coyle left the club by mutual agreement on 2 December 2013 having won seven games out of twenty-three.

On 7 December, Uwe Rösler, who had been managing Brentford, was appointed as Coyle's replacement. His first match, on 12 December, was a 2–1 defeat away to Maribor in the UEFA Europa League, which saw the club eliminated after finishing last in their group. On 9 March 2014 Wigan beat Manchester City in the 6th round of the FA Cup to reach the semi-final at Wembley for the second successive year, where they played Arsenal, and lost 2–4 on penalties after normal time and extra time resulted in a 1–1 draw. After finishing 5th in the 2013–14 Championship, Wigan qualified for the play-offs. Despite a 0–0 home draw in the first leg, they lost 2–1 after extra-time in the semi-finals to the eventual champions Queens Park Rangers.

Rösler was sacked in November 2014 with the club in the relegation places, having previously blamed a "hangover effect" from the previous season as the cause of Wigan's poor form. He was replaced by Malky Mackay, a controversial appointment due to an ongoing investigation into allegations of racist text messaging at his former club, Cardiff City. The remarks of Wigan chairman Dave Whelan to the controversy brought disciplinary action against him from the FA. Whelan resigned as chairman on 3 March 2015, remaining as owner but handing over the chairmanship to his grandson David Sharpe. The following month, with Wigan in danger of relegation to League One, Mackay was sacked and replaced by former Wigan captain Gary Caldwell. Despite a late season fightback including a 2-1 win against Brighton & Hove Albion in his first game, the team ended the 2014–15 season with relegation.

Caldwell oversaw a complete overhaul of the team, with an almost entirely new squad starting the League One season. The 2015–16 season saw success on the field as the club secured an immediate return and the League One title for the second time in their history with summer signing Will Grigg finishing as the league top scorer. Caldwell was unable to maintain this success and was sacked after a disappointing start to the Championship season and replaced by Warren Joyce. Joyce was also unable to turn around the team fortunes and was sacked after just 4 months in charge, Graham Barrow returned as an interim manager but was unable to stave off a second relegation in 3 years. Barrow departed the club and was replaced by Portsmouth F.C. manager Paul Cook at the end of the season.

In the 2017–18 League One season, Wigan finished top, winning promotion back to the Championship. Their promotion was sealed by a 4–0 win against Fleetwood Town. In the 2017–18 FA Cup, Wigan beat Manchester City in the Fifth Round Proper at home, winning 1–0 after Will Grigg scored in the 79th minute. In the quarterfinals, they were knocked out by Southampton in a 2–0 loss. At the end of the season it was announced that the Whelan family had agreed a deal to sell the club, stadium and training facilities to the Hong Kong-based International Entertainment Corporation (IEC) in a £22m deal. On 2 November 2018, IEC received shareholder approval to complete the acquisition of the football club, ending 23 years of Whelan family ownership.

In the 2018–19 season, Wigan finished 18th in the Championship with 52 points, well clear of the relegation zone.

=== Administration, relegation, and bouncing back: 2020–2022 ===
On 4 June 2020, IEC sold the majority of Wigan Athletic shareholdings to Hong Kong-based Next Leader Fund; the sale was formally ratified and approved by the shareholders of IEC, the Hong Kong Stock Exchange and the EFL. On 1 July 2020, the club – standing 14th in the Championship, eight points clear of relegation, in a season delayed due to the COVID-19 pandemic – announced it had gone into administration as Next Leader Fund had refused to invest promised money. Paul Stanley, Gerald Krasner and Dean Watson from Begbies Traynor were appointed as joint administrators. The insolvency left Wigan facing a 12-point deduction; the sanction would be applied at the end of the 2019–20 season if the club finished outside the bottom three after 46 games. On 2 July 2020, the administrators said they would investigate how the club ended up in administration less than a month after it changed owners. A private conversation about Wigan's situation involving EFL chairman Rick Parry was secretly filmed amid talk of betting on Wigan being relegated – described by some as the greatest sporting scandal of modern times. Wigan MP Lisa Nandy and Greater Manchester mayor Andy Burnham wrote a joint letter to Parry calling for an investigation into the club's takeover. Players had not been paid and there was talk of club staff being made redundant and of players being offered for sale, they said. Wigan's supporters club also called for an investigation and for financial support from the EFL; supporters, backed by Nandy, later launched an online petition to try to trigger a parliamentary debate around the EFL's owners' and directors' test.

On 4 July, Wigan, previously unbeaten in nine games, lost 3–0 at Brentford. Three days later, 75 (approximately half) of the club's non-playing staff were made redundant by the administrators, and Wigan Warriors expressed interest in buying the football club (a move later supported by Wigan council). On 10 July, midfielder Jensen Weir was set to be sold to Brighton & Hove Albion for £500,000 plus add-ons to help alleviate Wigan's financial problems; England Under-16 international midfielder Alfie Devine was later sold to Tottenham. Bids were due by 21 July; on 22 July (the day of Wigan's final game of the season), Krasner said administrators had received five offers and identified an unnamed preferred bidder; they were seeking completion of the sale by 31 July. However, on 24 July, talks with the preferred bidder broke down and administrators began negotiations with other parties, which continued into early August.

Meanwhile, on 7 July 2020 the club had appealed against the 12-point deduction imposed by the EFL for entering administration. On 14 July, Wigan recorded their biggest League victory, beating Hull City 8–0. This, combined with other results, meant Wigan would not finish in the relegation places, so the 12-point deduction would be applied at the end of the current season. Wigan's appeal against the points deduction, heard on 31 July, was set to cost the club between £400,000 and £500,000. Wigan drew 1–1 against Fulham in their final game of the season; the 12-point deduction pushed Wigan into the bottom three, meaning the club would play in League One if its appeal was unsuccessful. On 4 August, the club's relegation was confirmed and, following the resignation of manager Paul Cook, Leam Richardson was appointed caretaker manager.

On 17 August 2020, it was reported that Au Yeung Wai Kay, the club's owner, had, on 23 June, asked Begbies Traynor about putting it into administration before completing his takeover. Begbies Traynor disputed the account, produced by an independent commission, saying administration was one of several scenarios discussed. The commission said Kay was "not open" with Wigan officials about his conversation with Begbies Traynor, and subsequently gave "either false or knowingly misleading" assurances about future funding. The administrator was still attempting to find a buyer; if no agreement was reached by 31 August, Begbies Traynor said it would have to consider whether the club can be funded into the 2020–21 season, due to start on Saturday 12 September 2020. On 20 August, Kay was reported to be waiving a £36m debt owed to him by the club in an effort to expedite its sale. Wigan supporters began a fund-raising effort, initially raising £500,000 to help secure the club's future, and then raising £200,000 more. Administrators had been confident a sale would be agreed by their deadline, but later revised their opinion.

On 9 September 2020, with the club's situation set to be discussed at an EFL meeting, the administrators were reportedly "quietly optimistic" about Wigan being allowed to start the EFL season despite being ownerless. They appointed John Sheridan as the club's new manager, who was in charge as Wigan lost their first League game of the season 2–0 at Ipswich Town. On 21 September, the administrators reported that bids would need to top £3m to secure the sale as the club had a "considerable liability" to HM Revenue and Customs, owed wages to players, and also had to pay for August's unsuccessful appeal against the points deduction.

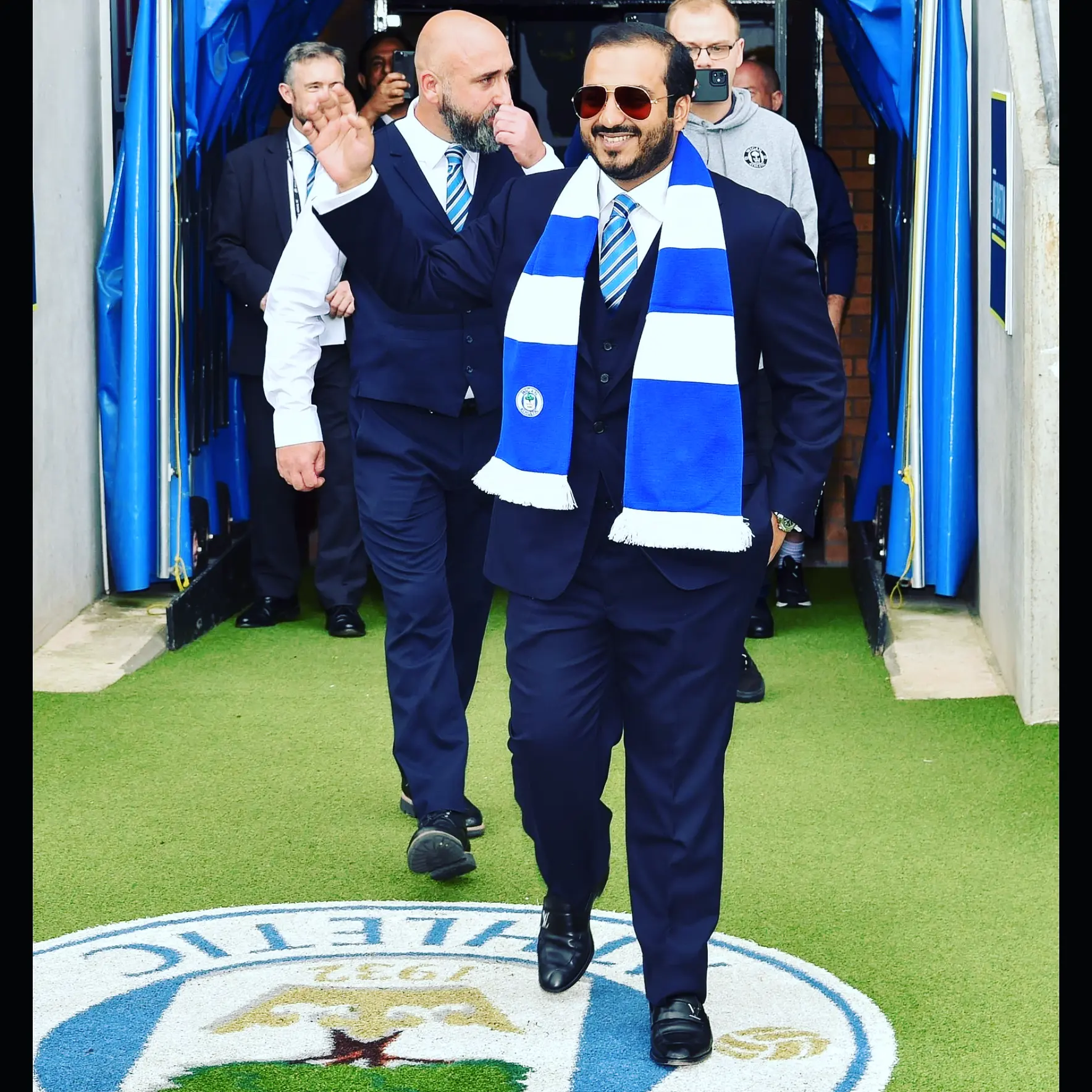
Wigan Athletic chairman Talal Al Hammad

On 30 September, the administrators said they had reached an agreement with an unnamed bidder from Spain to purchase the club, and were working on paperwork to gain EFL approval. In early November, former Wigan manager Roberto Martinez was reported to assisting with the Spanish bid. On 13 November, after three wins in 15 Wigan games, manager Sheridan left to become Swindon Town's new manager. On 20 November, additional time was granted to the prospective new owners to complete their purchase. In early December, with the club bottom of League One, it emerged that a member of the Spanish consortium had a disqualifying condition, so Wigan's administrators had to make a fresh application to the EFL on behalf of Felipe Moreno, owner of Spanish LaLiga 2 side Leganés. However, on 5 January 2021, the Moreno take-over bid fell through; administrators began talking to other bidders, with, on 15 January 11 parties said to be interested in buying the club. By early March 2021, the administrators were in advanced talks with a consortium, Phoenix 2021 Ltd, led by Bahrain businessmen Abdulrahman Al-Jasmi and Talal Mubarak al-Hammad, and a takeover was agreed on 15 March, subject to EFL approval and finalisation of paperwork. Under the proposed deal, Al-Hammad would become chairman, and Mal Brannigan (previously involved with Dundalk and Dundee United) would be chief executive. EFL approval for the takeover was confirmed on 30 March 2021. In May, the former administrators repaid £171,000 raised by supporters to keep the club going when it first went into administration.

The club finished the 2020–21 season in 20th position, one point above the relegation places. A year later, Wigan Athletic won the League One title in 2021–22, earning promotion back to the Championship after a final day 3–0 victory at Shrewsbury Town.

=== 2023: Financial issues, relegation and a new owner ===
On 7 March 2023, Wigan reported a £7.7m loss for the financial year to June 2022. Four days later, Wigan released a statement saying there would be a temporary delay in meeting wage obligations due to liquidity issues; the EFL was aware of the situation and on 20 March 2023, bottom-of-the-table Wigan were docked three points for failing to pay players, having had a previous EFL sanction for non-payment suspended. The club and its owner, Al-Jasmi, also faced new charges. Player Steven Caulker accused the club's leadership of lying and "absolutely scandalous" behaviour regarding four late wages payments, and team-mates did not train on 24 March in protest at the club's financial crisis. Later that day, Wigan chairman Talal Al-Hammad announced players had been paid, and said CEO Mal Brannigan had left the club. On 29 April 2023, Wigan were relegated from the Championship. Several players' April wages were again paid late - the fifth time this had happened during the season - and the delays continued into mid-May with the Professional Footballers' Association helping "frustrated and angry" players. On 16 May 2023, the club's owners paid a "substantial" seven-figure amount, with proof shown to the EFL, to keep the club going and ensure all wages were paid.

In late May 2023, Wigan were hit with two further deductions of points ahead of the 2023–24 League One season. First, on 19 May, the EFL announced Wigan would be deducted four points for failing to pay players' wages. A further four-point deduction was suspended until 30 June 2024, but would be triggered if wages are again paid late before then. The EFL also retrospectively deducted three points from the club's 2022–23 season total; Wigan therefore finished the season on 39 points, 10 points from safety. Owner Al-Jasmi was also required to deposit an amount covering 125% of the club's forecast monthly wage bill by 24 May 2023 or face further sanctions. Second, on 26 May, a further four-point deduction was made after Al-Jasmi missed that deadline despite being given extra time. The club would therefore start its next season with minus eight points.

Club chairman Talal Al-Hammad said an imminent "eight-figure sum" would ensure "financial stability" until the end of the 2023–24 season, and outlined plans including a 65% reduction in Wigan's wage bill after an "unsustainable" Championship relegation campaign. However, the expected payment had not been made by 2 June 2023 and some players were again unpaid, risking further EFL sanctions, and prompting fans groups to urge a sale of the club. Two of Wigan's three directors resigned on 4 June 2023 as fears of a possible winding-up order from HMRC grew, before the owners said they had agreed to sell the club to "a new buyer" who had "committed to resolving all outstanding liabilities at the earliest opportunity", with any deal "subject to EFL approval". However, the potential buyer, Sarbjot Johal, was also involved in negotiations to buy Morecambe and had not provided proof of sufficient funding. On 9 June 2023, Wigan Athletic were placed under a transfer embargo for contravening EFL tax payment rules, and, three days later, HMRC lodged a winding-up petition over unpaid tax, with a hearing date of 26 July. Also on 12 June 2023, it was reported that Wigan Warriors RLFC co-owner Mike Danson had renewed his interest in buying Wigan Athletic, with the takeover confirmed on 14 June. On 27 July 2023, defender Jack Whatmough and midfielder Jamie McGrath terminated their contracts with the club following repeated contractual breaches by the previous ownership.
