= 1929–30 Carlisle United F.C. season =

Carlisle United F.C.
1929–30 season
- Manager: George Bristow (to February); Billy Hampson
- Stadium: Brunton Park
- Third Division North: 15th
- FA Cup: Third round

For the 1929–30 season, Carlisle United F.C. competed in Football League Third Division North.

== Results & fixtures ==
=== Football League Third Division North ===
==== League table ====
Pos	Team	Pld	W	D	L	GF	GA	GAv	Pts
13	New Brighton	42	16	8	18	69	79	0.873	40
14	Doncaster Rovers	42	15	9	18	62	69	0.899	39
15	Carlisle United	42	16	7	19	90	101	0.891	39
16	Accrington Stanley	42	14	9	19	84	81	1.037	37
17	Wrexham	42	13	8	21	67	88	0.761	34

Source: rsssf.com

==== Matches ====
Match Day	Date	Opponent	H/A	Score	Carlisle United Scorer(s)	Attendance
1	31 August	Crewe Alexandra	H	2–0		
2	3 September	Southport	A	3–4		
3	7 September	York City	A	2–2		
4	12 September	Southport	H	4–0		
5	14 September	Stockport County	H	1–5		
6	21 September	New Brighton	A	1–2		
7	25 September	Wigan Borough	A	0–8		
8	28 September	Port Vale	H	1–4		
9	5 October	Barrow	A	2–0		
10	12 October	Wrexham	H	5–1		
11	19 October	Darlington	A	0–3		
12	26 October	Hartlepools United	H	5–2		
13	2 November	Doncaster Rovers	A	2–1		
14	9 November	Chesterfield	H	6–0		
15	16 November	Lincoln City	A	1–4		
16	23 November	Tranmere Rovers	H	4–3		
17	7 December	Rotherham United	H	3–1		
18	21 December	South Shields	H	4–1		
19	25 December	Nelson	A	2–2		
20	28 December	Crewe Alexandra	A	2–1		
21	1 January	Accrington Stanley	A	2–7		
22	4 January	York City	H	2–2		
23	18 January	Stockport County	A	1–7		
24	23 January	Nelson	H	2–2		
25	25 January	New Brighton	H	2–2		
26	1 February	Port Vale	A	0–4		
27	8 February	Barrow	H	7–1		
28	15 February	Wrexham	A	3–3		
29	20 February	Halifax Town	A	0–1		
30	22 February	Darlington	H	1–4		
31	1 March	Hartlepools United	A	0–1		
32	8 March	Doncaster Rovers	H	1–1		
33	15 March	Chesterfield	A	1–3		
34	22 March	Lincoln City	H	2–4		
35	29 March	Tranmere Rovers	A	0–3		
36	5 April	Halifax Town	H	2–0		
37	12 April	Rotherham United	A	1–4		
38	18 April	Accrington Stanley	H	2–1		
39	19 April	Rochdale	H	2–0		
40	26 April	South Shields	A	2–5		
41	29 April	Rochdale	A	0–2		
42	3 May	Wigan Borough	H	5–0		

=== FA Cup ===
Round	Date	Opponent	H/A	Score	Carlisle United Scorer(s)	Attendance
R1	30 November	Halifax Town	H	2–0		
R2	14 December	Crewe Alexandra	H	4–2		
R3	11 January	Everton	H	2–4		
