= Reg Stockill =

English footballer (1913–1995)

Personal information
- Full name: Reginald Robert Stockill
- Date of birth: 24 November 1913
- Place of birth: York, Yorkshire, England
- Date of death: 24 December 1995 (aged 82)
- Place of death: York, North Yorkshire, England
- Position: Inside forward

Senior career*
Years	Team	Apps	(Gls)
1929–1930	York City	2	(1)
1930–1931	Scarborough		
1931–1934	Arsenal	7	(4)
1934–1939	Derby County	66	(29)
1939	Luton Town	0	(0)
Total		75	(34)
- * Club domestic league appearances and goals

Reginald Robert Stockill (24 November 1913 – 24 December 1995) was an English footballer who played as an inside forward in the Football League for York City, Arsenal and Derby County.

== Biography ==
Reginald Robert Stockill was born on 24 November 1913 in York, Yorkshire. He played as an inside forward and started his career with York City. He became the club's youngest first-team player when he made his debut aged 15 years and 281 days on 29 August 1929 in a 2–0 win over Wigan Borough in the Third Division North. Stockill scored in the match, a feat which made him the second most youngest person to score in a Football League match, as well York's youngest scorer in the Football League. Stockill only played one more match for York before moving to non-League Scarborough for the 1930–31 season, in which he scored three goals in the Midland League.

Stockill was signed by Arsenal in 1931, while still six months shy of his 18th birthday. He made his debut on 27 April 1932 against Huddersfield Town and played the last three games of the 1931–32 season and the first two of 1932–33, scoring in both, before being displaced by Ernie Coleman. He only played two more games for Arsenal, his final appearance coming as they beat Blackburn Rovers 8–0, in which Stockill scored. After spending all of the 1933–34 season in the reserve team he moved to Derby County for a fee of £2,000 in September 1934. In total he played eight games for Arsenal, scoring four goals.

At Derby, a serious knee injury incurred in a match on 26 December 1934 kept him out of the game for 15 months, which severely hampered his career. After five seasons and just 66 league appearances at Derby, he left for Luton Town in 1939. The outbreak of the Second World War ended his football playing career.

Stockill died aged 82 on 24 December 1995 at York Hospital in York, North Yorkshire.

== Career statistics ==
Appearances and goals by club, season and competition
Club	Season	League			FA Cup		Total	
Club	Season	Division	Apps	Goals	Apps	Goals	Apps	Goals
York City	1929–30	Third Division North	1	1	1	0	2	1
York City	1930–31	Third Division North	1	0	—		1	0
York City	Total		2	1	1	0	3	1
Arsenal	1931–32	First Division	3	1	0	0	3	1
Arsenal	1932–33	First Division	4	3	0	0	4	3
Arsenal	Total		7	4	0	0	7	4
Derby County	1934–35	First Division	17	8	0	0	17	8
Derby County	1935–36	First Division	10	3	0	0	10	3
Derby County	1936–37	First Division	21	12	3	1	24	13
Derby County	1937–38	First Division	8	1	0	0	8	1
Derby County	1938–39	First Division	10	5	0	0	10	5
Derby County	Total		66	29	3	1	69	30
Luton Town	1939–40	Second Division	0 (Note: Stockill made three appearances, scoring two goals, for Luton Town in the 1939–40 Football League before the season was abandoned after the outbreak of the Second World War.)	0	—		0	0
Career total			75	34	4	1	79	35
