= Sam Evans (disambiguation) =

Sam Evans is a fictional character from the Fox musical comedy-drama series Glee

Sam or Samantha Evans may also refer to:

- Sam Evans (television personality), Big Brother 14 contestant from Llanelli, born with 70-80% hearing loss
- Sam Evans (cricketer) (born 1997), English cricketer
- Sam Evans (footballer) (1904–?), Scottish footballer
- Samantha Evans (singer), Australian Christian worship leader and band member Planetshakers
- Samantha Evans (Days of Our Lives), character from the American soap opera Days of Our Lives

== See also ==
- Samuel Evans (disambiguation)
