= Henry Beck =

Henry Beck may refer to:

- Henry Beck (politician) (born 1986), American lawyer and politician from Maine
- Harry Beck (born Henry Charles Beck; 1902–1974), English technical draughtsman
- Henry Charlton Beck (1902–1965), author, journalist, historian, ordained Episcopal minister and folklorist
- Henry C. Beck III (born 1955), American Texas-born businessman
- Harry Beck (footballer) (born Henry Alfred Beck; 1901–1979), English footballer

== See also ==
- Henry Bech, fictional character in John Updike works
