= Sam Gallagher (disambiguation) =

Sam Gallagher may refer to:

- Sam Gallagher (Australian rules footballer), Australian rules footballer.
- Sam Gallagher (footballer, born 1995), English footballer.
- Sam Gallagher (soccer, born 1991), Australian footballer.

== See also ==
- Sam Gallacher (born 1904), Scottish footballer.
