= 1928–29 Carlisle United F.C. season =

Carlisle United F.C.
1928–29 season
- Manager: George Bristow
- Stadium: Brunton Park
- Third Division North: 8th
- FA Cup: Second round

In the 1928–29 season, Carlisle United played in the Football League Third Division North, having been elected to the league from the North Eastern League at the end of the previous season.

== Football League Third Division North ==
=== League table ===
Pos	Team	Pld	W	D	L	GF	GA	GAv	Pts
6	Lincoln City	42	21	6	15	91	67	1.358	48
7	Tranmere Rovers	42	22	3	17	79	77	1.026	47
8	Carlisle United (Note: New club in the league; elected from North Eastern League)	42	19	8	15	86	77	1.117	46
9	Crewe Alexandra	42	18	8	16	80	68	1.176	44
10	South Shields	42	18	8	16	83	74	1.122	44

Source: rsssf.com

=== Matches ===
Date	Opponent	H/A	Score	Scorer(s)	Attendance
25 August	Accrington Stanley	A	3–2		
30 August	Bradford City	H	2–2		
1 September	Hartlepools United	H	8–0		
3 September	Bradford City	A	2–4		
8 September	Darlington	A	0–0		
13 September	Southport	H	4–2		
15 September	Rotherham United	A	0–4		
22 September	Wigan Borough	H	2–1		
29 September	Crewe Alexandra	A	1–1		
6 October	Tranmere Rovers	H	4–1		
13 October	Stockport County	A	2–2		
20 October	Nelson	H	4–0		
27 October	South Shields	A	0–5		
3 November	Ashington	H	5–1		
10 November	Doncaster Rovers	A	0–3		
17 November	Barrow	A	1–1		
1 December	Wrexham	H	1–1		
12 December	New Brighton	A	0–1		
15 December	Rochdale	H	4–2		
22 December	Southport	A	3–4		
25 January	Halifax Town	H	2–1		
26 December	Halifax Town	A	2–5		
29 December	Accrington Stanley	H	4–3		
1 January	Lincoln City	H	3–1		
5 January	Hartlepools United	A	0–1		
12 January	Rochdale	A	0–4		
19 January	Darlington	H	3–0		
26 January	Rotherham United	H	1–1		
2 February	Wigan Borough	A	2–2		
9 February	Crewe Alexandra	H	1–0		
16 February	Tranmere Rovers	A	2–1		
23 February	Stockport County	H	0–5		
2 March	Nelson	A	0–1		
9 March	South Shields	H	5–0		
13 March	Chesterfield	A	2–1		
16 March	Ashington	A	4–0		
23 March	Doncaster Rovers	H	1–2		
29 March	Lincoln City	A	0–3		
30 March	Barrow	H	4–1		
6 April	Chesterfield	H	1–2		
13 April	Wrexham	A	1–5		
20 April	New Brighton	H	2–1		

== FA Cup ==
Round	Date	Opponent	H/A	Score	Scorer(s)	Attendance
R1	24 November	Wrexham	A	1–0		
R2	8 December	Lincoln City	H	0–1		
