= Wigan United A.F.C. =

Wigan United
- Full name: Wigan United Association Football Club
- Founded: 1894
- Ground: The West End Grounds, Springfield Park and Westwood Athletic Grounds
- Capacity: 30,000 (approx)
- League: Lancashire League
Home colours

Wigan United A.F.C. was an association football club existing from around 1894 into the early 1900s, and was based in Wigan, Lancashire, England.

== History ==
The 1900–01 season saw the club in the Lancashire League, and rumours circulating around the town suggested they were going to be a great success playing in the Football League within the year. The opposite turned out to be the case, first match was lost to Southport Central 4–1 and things went from bad to worse with the club finishing in tenth place (out of eleven clubs with Stalybridge Rovers as champions).
One unusual event which occurred during the season was when Wigan United were due to play at Stalybridge Rovers in a Charity Cup match. The pitch was heavy and waterlogged and, in the opinion of the Wigan United team, unplayable. When they refused to play, the referee ordered the Stalybridge team to take the ball down the field and kick it into the empty net, and then awarded them the game

Season 1901–02 was much better, Wigan United finishing in third place behind champions Darwen and runner-up Southport Central.

The 1902–03 season was a return to reality with the club almost setting a new record for the Lancashire League by playing for the whole season without winning a game. This was averted in the penultimate game of the season when United recorded a 1–3 success, beating local rivals, Chorley, at Rangletts Recreation Ground. The club finished bottom of the twelve team league with Southport Central as champions.
At the end of the season the Lancashire league became, in effect, the Second Division of the Lancashire Combination, and the league itself closed. Wigan United did not apply for the new league.

It was rumoured that United were to join the Lancashire Alliance League for the 1903/04 season but no record can be found of results from that year. United then went unreported for a number of years as Wigan Town became the main focus of football in the town, but a photograph exists of Wigan United from 1908 and in 1909 the club joined the newly formed Wigan and District Junior Alliance League. A General Meeting was held on 5 September 1909 naming R. Barlow as secretary and treasurer, John Holland as captain and Chris O'Brian as vice-captain. The meeting also announced that the club would once again use the Westwood ground. The club are recorded as playing against Wigan Shops FC on 28 January 1914 No further records of the club are found as football was suspended for the period of World War 1.

Although not the first club to reside at Springfield Park, United are the oldest, pre-dating Wigan County by at least four seasons.

It is also possible that the club reformed in 1919 and eventually became Wigan Borough in 1920.

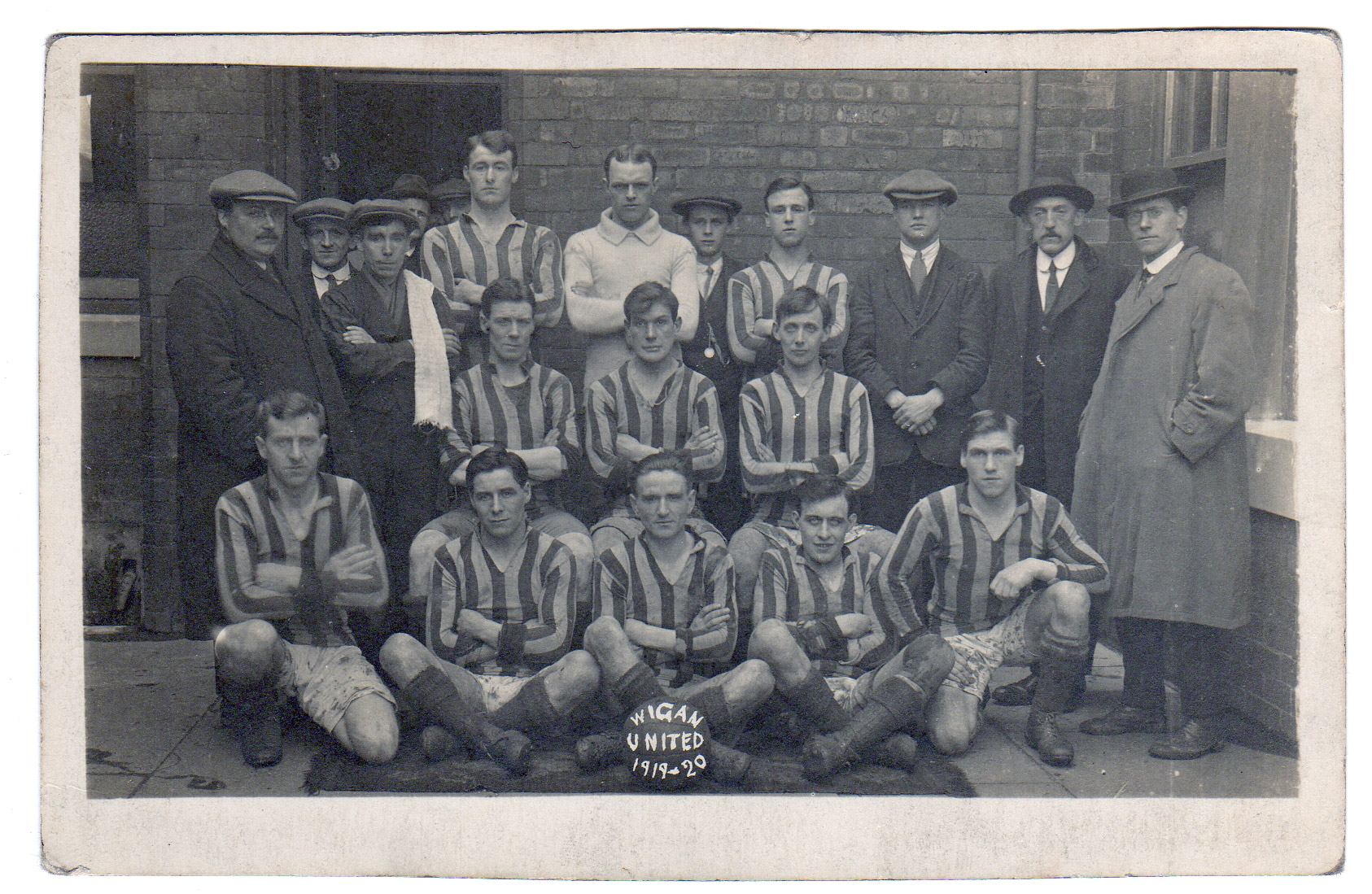
The revived Wigan United FC in 1919–20

== Colours ==
The club wore green and white quarters.

== Grounds ==
For the first few months of season 1900–01 the club played at the West End Ground
They then played at Springfield Park between November 1900 and December 1902 when the club's lease expired., after which date, all their games were played away from home

== League positions ==
Pos	Season	Competition	Pl	W	D	L	GF	GA	GD	Pts	NiL
10	1900–01	Lancashire League	20	3	3	14	21	49	−28	9	
3	1901–02	Lancashire League	24	15	3	6	56	25	31	33	
12	1902–03	Lancashire League	22	1	3	18	18	74	−56	5	

Pos = league position – Pl = games played – W = win – D = draw – L = lost
GF = goals for – GA = goals against – D= goal difference – Pts = points gained
NiL = number of clubs in league

== See also ==
- Wigan County F.C.
- Wigan Town A.F.C
- Wigan Borough F.C.
- Wigan Athletic F.C.
- Wigan Robin Park F.C.
