= Jimmy Cowie =

Scottish footballer

Personal information
- Place of birth: Keith, Scotland
- Date of death: 1966
- Position: Striker

Senior career*
Years	Team	Apps	(Gls)
?–1926	Keith	?	(?)
1926–1928	Raith Rovers	?	(?)
1928–1931	York City	67	(58)
1931–?	Keith	?	(?)
- * Club domestic league appearances and goals

James G. Cowie (born in Keith, Scotland - died 1966) was a Scottish footballer.

== Career ==
Cowie started his career with Keith, where he played until joining Raith Rovers in 1926. He joined York City in 1928.

During the 1928–29 season, Cowie scored a total of 56 goals in 56 appearances for York. He scored in York's first game in the Football League against Wigan Borough. He returned to Keith in the summer of 1931.

In 1938, he played alongside his 16-year-old son, also named Jim Cowie, at Keith F.C.

Later in life, Cowie was a keen bowls player and snooker player. He also worked in insurance. He died in 1966.
