= Wigan County F.C. =

Wigan County
- Full name: Wigan County Football Club
- Nickname: County
- Founded: 1897
- Dissolved: 1900
- Ground: Springfield Park
- Capacity: 30,000 (approx)
- League: Lancashire League
Home colours

Wigan County F.C. was an association football club based in Wigan, who competed at national level. They were the first football team to play their games at Springfield Park and would be followed by Wigan United, Wigan Town, Wigan Borough and Wigan Athletic.

== History ==
Wigan County were formed in May 1897, and were accepted into the Lancashire League. The club pulled off something of a coup, signing former Everton goalkeeper Robert Menham, and announced their ambitions to play in the Football League.

The first match was played on 25 August 1897, with the club letting the supporters in for free, the intention being to raise the club's profile. The second game was played in atrocious weather conditions, but still attracted a crowd of over 3,000.

The first recorded game was on Wednesday, 1 September 1897, at Springfield Park. About 1,500 people braved the awful conditions that had persisted in Wigan for the last month or so, to see County draw 1–1 with Burton Swifts in a friendly game. The club's first Lancashire League game was against Southport Central, on 11 September 1897, a game in which they won 5–1 in front of a crowd of 4000. Paddy Gordon scored County's first League goal during the first half of this match. Admission prices were considered to be steep, costing 4d and 8d.

County made a bid to join the football league in 1898, not expecting to be accepted. They were not, but they managed to receive seven votes whereas Coventry City, a club much bigger than County, received none.

=== County and the Cups ===
In County's first F.A. Cup run, they qualified for the first round proper by beating Fleetwood Rangers 1–0, Hurst Ramblers 4–3, Blackburn Park Road 2–1 and Nelson 3–1. In the fifth qualifying round they played Division 2 Darwen, drawing 1–1. They won the replay on 15 December 1897 by four goals to nil. County drew Manchester City, who at the time played in the old Football League Division Two, at Ardwick. The game took place on 29 January 1898 and Manchester City won 1–0, courtesy of a goalkeeping error. Playing for County that day was Jack Gordon, who scored the first ever football league goal for Preston North End against Burnley in 1888. He also played in the match that saw the highest recorded number of goals in an F.A cup game, as Preston North End dispatched Hyde United 26–0 in 1887.

County's first Lancashire cup game was against Bacup in October 1897, which County won 1–0. In the next round in December 1897, County played Newton Heath (later to become Manchester United). After eighty-three minutes, the game was stopped due to bad light, with County losing 6–0. The club attempted to get the result overturned, but the Lancashire F.A ruled that the result would stand.

In the 1898/99 season, County won Wigan's first ever trophy, the Rawclife Charity Cup; Wigan beat St Helens Recreation 2–0 at Dole Lane, Chorley in front of 6,000 spectators. Later the club paraded the trophy around Wigan in a wagonette, accompanied by a brass band.

=== The demise of Wigan County ===
On 13 September 1899, George Wilcock offered Springfield Park up for auction at the venue where the ground was born – The Ship Hotel. The ground covered almost 18 acres (73,000 m^{2}) of land and contained a 'half mile cinder trotting track', an 'excellent cinder pedestrian track', a 'grand cement cycling track' and a 'splendid football ground, with a grandstand, entrance turnstiles and refreshment bars'. Bids started at £4,500 and the ground was eventually sold for £6000 to a Wigan syndicate, who then sold it to the Royal London Friendly Society for the same amount. It was also revealed that County had a contract to play there until 30 April 1900, although financial problems forced the club to leave at the end of March. The final four 'home' games were played at The Anchor Ground at Darwen, Green Lane at Stockport and two at the Recreation Ground, Ashton-in-Makerfield.

In October 1899, there was a meeting of all local football clubs to discuss if there were any means of helping County, whose squad was restricted to only thirteen players. Thirty clubs attended the meeting and all agreed that the county could have the best of local talent. In return County provided the amateur clubs with a qualified instructor, to help them improve.

Two months later, the club was rumoured to be closed, this was not yet the case. However, after poor results and falling attendances, the club agreed to fulfil all its fixtures before folding on 29 June 1900.

== Colours ==
The club played in red and white "quarters", the term used at the time for halved shirts with counterchanged sleeves. The colours were later used by Wigan Borough.

== Notable players ==
- (Scotland) John Cunningham
- (Ireland) Andy Gara
- (England) John Grundy
