= Samuel Evans =

Samuel Evans may refer to:

- Samuel Evans (VC) (c. 1821–1901), Scottish recipient of the Victoria Cross
- Satyananda Stokes (1882–1946), Samuel Evans Stokes, apple grower and freedom fighter
- Samuel Evans (Texas politician), Texas state representative, 1865–1870 in Eleventh Texas Legislature; Texas state senator, 1870–1874 in Twelfth Texas Legislature
- Samuel B. Evans (1812–1836), Alamo defender
- Samuel Evans (British politician) (1859–1918), Welsh politician
- Samuel Evans (naval officer), commander of USS Hornet and later of Brooklyn Navy Yard
- Sticks Evans (Samuel Evans), American drummer

== See also ==
- Sam Evans (disambiguation)
