= Charlie Davis (footballer) =

English footballer

Personal information
- Date of birth: 1904
- Place of birth: Bristol, England
- Date of death: q1 1967 (aged 63)
- Place of death: Bristol, England
- Height: 6 ft 0 in (1.83 m)
- Position: Half-back

Senior career*
Years	Team	Apps	(Gls)
–1927	Bath City		
1927–1929	Torquay United	28	(0)
1929–1931	York City	61	(1)
1931–1932	Mansfield Town	5	(1)
1932–	Glastonbury		
- Bath City
Total		94	(2)
- * Club domestic league appearances and goals

Charles F. Davis (1904 – q1 1967) was an English professional footballer who played as a half-back in the Football League for Torquay United, York City and Mansfield Town and in non-League football for Bath City and Glastonbury.
