= Fulfordgate =

Football ground in England

- Location of Fulfordgate
- Full name: Fulfordgate
- Location: Fulford, York, England
- Coordinates: 53°56′13.83″N 1°3′59.25″W
- Owner: York City F.C.
- Operator: York City F.C.
- Capacity: 17,000 (1929 estimate)
- Surface: Grass
- Record attendance: 12,721 (York City vs Sheffield United, FA Cup, 14 January 1931)

Construction
- Built: 1922
- Opened: 20 September 1922
- Demolished: 1932

Tenant
- York City F.C. (1922–1932)

Fulfordgate was an association football ground in Fulford, York, England, and was the home of York City Football Club from 1922 to 1932. The ground was located next to Heslington Lane, and was purchased by York for £2,000 following their formation in 1922.

The club's first two home matches were played at another venue as Fulfordgate was not ready, and the ground hosted its first match against Mansfield Town in September 1922. The highest attendance at the ground was 12,721, which came against Sheffield United in an FA Cup match in 1931. York decided to move to Bootham Crescent, which had been vacated by York Cricket Club in 1932, as Fulfordgate was relatively inaccessible. The ground was sold and developed as a housing estate, and Eastward Avenue now lies at its former location.

== History ==
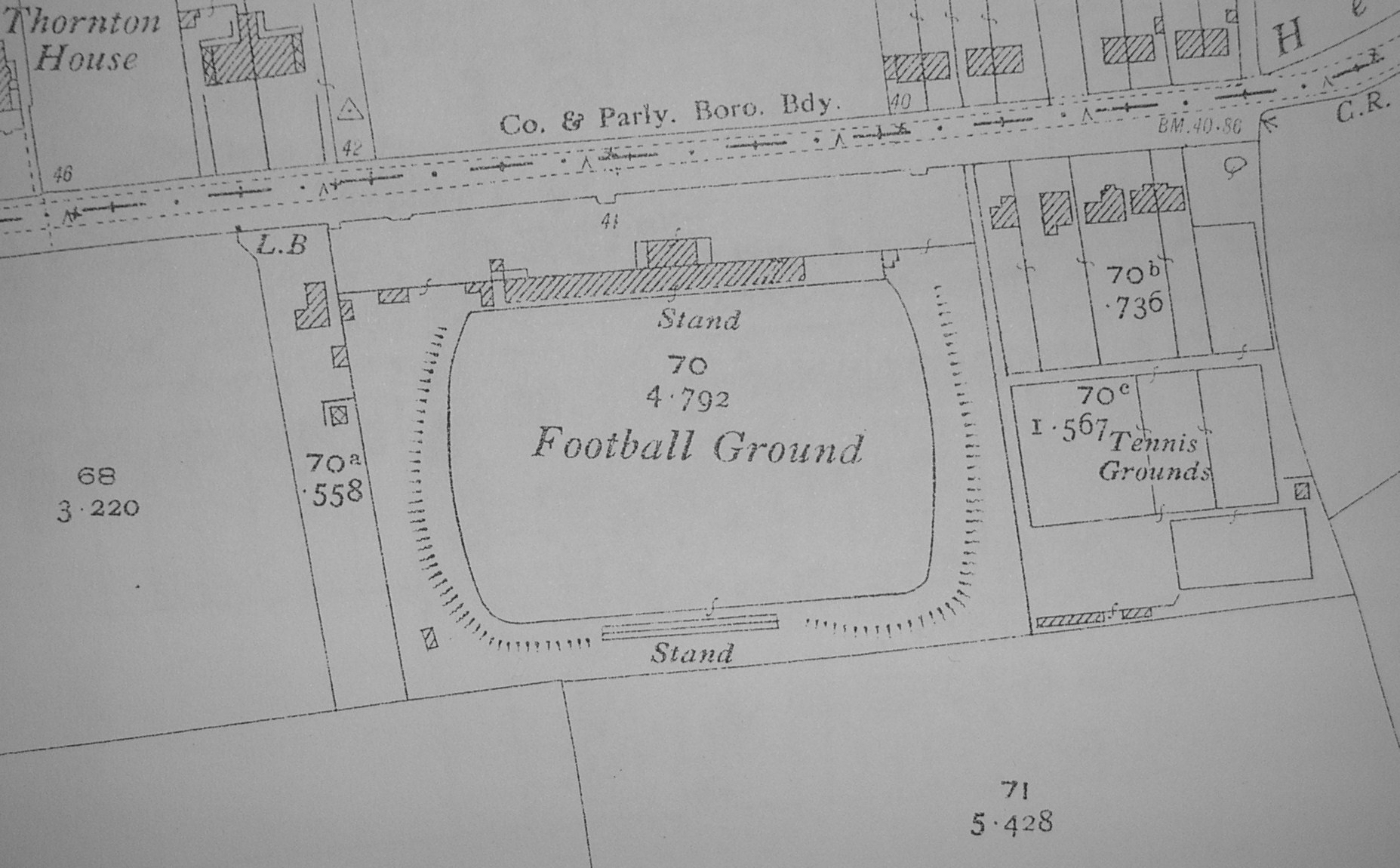
The ground and surrounding area, as displayed on a 1931 Ordnance Survey map

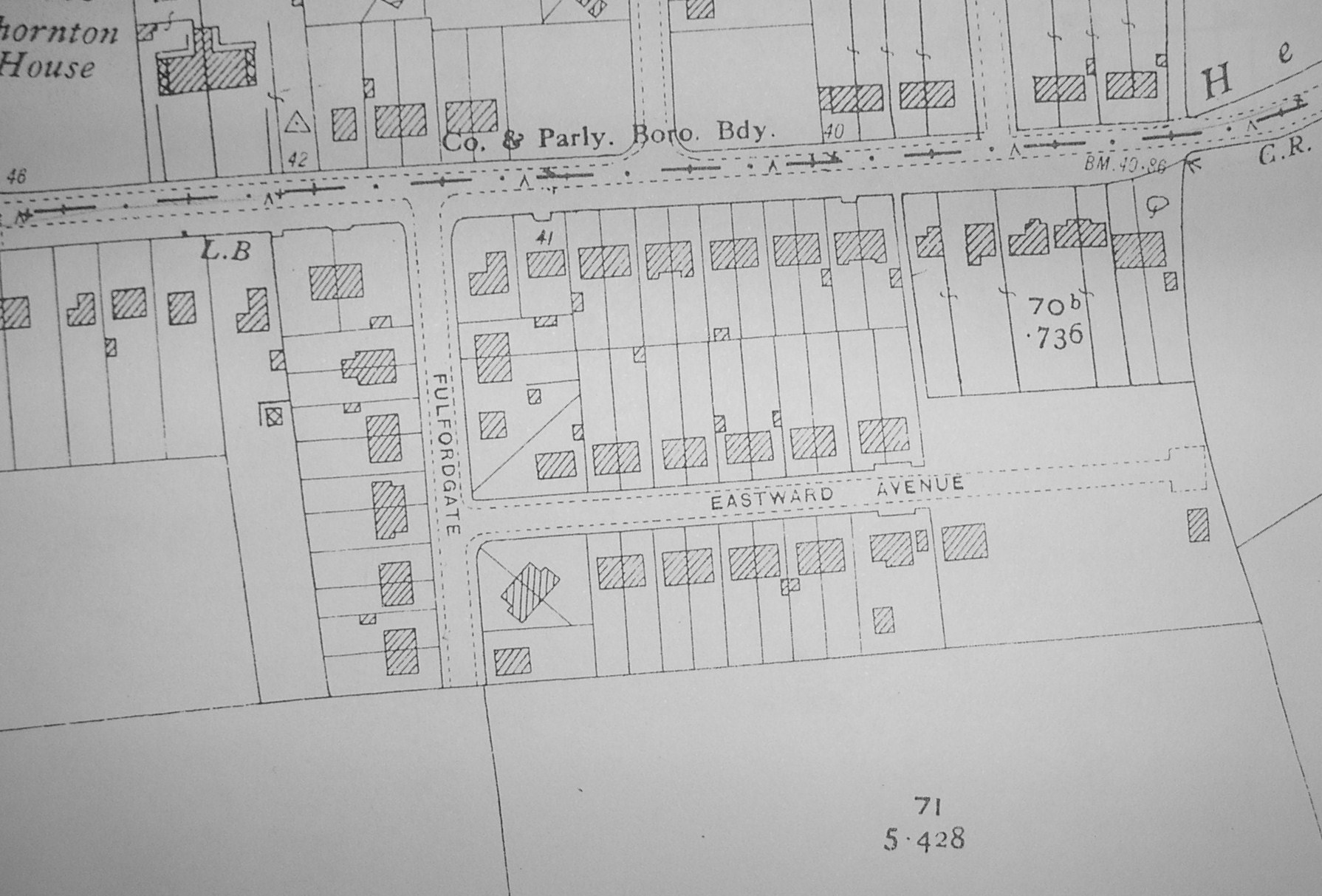
By 1936 the site had been converted to residential use.

Following York City F.C.'s formation in 1922, the club purchased 8 acres (3.2 ha) of land for £2,000 in Heslington Lane, Fulford, York. This was in the south-east of the city in a rural setting, which was surrounded by hawthorn hedges and was well drained. The land was known as Gate Fulford, which was reversed to become known as Fulfordgate. As the ground was not ready, York played their first two home matches at Mille Crux, Haxby Road, which was owned by Messrs Rowntree & Company Limited. The first match played at Fulfordgate was a 4–1 victory over Mansfield Town on 20 September 1922, which only went ahead after director John Fisher paid the requisite deposit of £180. When York applied for election into the Football League in 1927, they stated that Fulfordgate was "splendidly drained, well equipped, spacious and capable of being extended to hold up to 40,000 spectators". By the time of the club's admission into the Football League in 1929, the ground was estimated hold a capacity of 17,000. When York set their then-record attendance of 12,583 against Newcastle United in an FA Cup third round replay on 15 January 1930, approximately 4,000 supporters had to be turned away as the gates were closed an hour before kick-off. York finished the 1929–30 season with an average attendance of 5,247, higher than 17 other Third Division North clubs.

Concern was expressed at York's poor support towards the end of their third season in the Football League, and director G. W. Halliday believed the only solution was a change of ground. A major problem was the ground's relatively inaccessible location, and in early 1932, York held preliminary discussions about moving to Bootham Crescent, which had been vacated by York Cricket Club. A special meeting of the shareholders was held, in which chairman Arthur Brown drew attention to gate receipts figures in Fulfordgate's three Football League seasons, which represented average crowds of 4,000 and a deficit on the balance sheet. It was pointed out by Halliday that within one mile (1.6 km) of Bootham Crescent the population was 30,000, whereas it was only 3,000 for a similar radius of Fulfordgate. The directors were satisfied that the new ground would fulfil all requirements, although there was some opposition to the move. Two former directors argued that attendances at many grounds had fallen during the Great Depression, and that the approaches and surrounds to Bootham Crescent were limited. Following much discussion, the decision to move to lease Bootham Crescent was approved by 115 votes to 37, and Fulfordgate was sold and developed as a housing estate. Today, Eastward Avenue occupies the area where the ground once stood.

== Structure and facilities ==
Fulfordgate did not initially have any covered stands, and the dressing rooms consisted of an old army hut, before open stands were bought from York Race Committee. The ground was gradually built up and improved, and covered accommodation was available after two years. In 1927, new turnstiles were installed and stronger fencing was built around the pitch, which made it more difficult for spectators to surmount it and access the pitch. Nine-tier terracing replaced the old banking behind one of the goals, the covered Popular Stand was extended to hold 1,000 supporters and there a small seated stand was erected.

== Transport ==
Fulfordgate was located in the south-east of York, away from the city centre. It was a large distance from York railway station, while the tram service to Fulford only had one track, and the loop system for tramcars passing each other further restricted the service. During the ground's existence, bus routes had not been fully developed and car ownership was not yet become common; it was not easy for the majority of supporters to reach.

== Other uses ==
The ground hosted the Yorkshire Flower Show and Gala in June 1924, after the event had been held at Bootham Park for the previous 60 years. It annually hosted Faber Cup races for the York Harriers, which consisted of six-mile courses over grass with hurdles, on a number of occasions. An amateur international was held at the ground when England played Ireland on 14 November 1931.

== Records ==
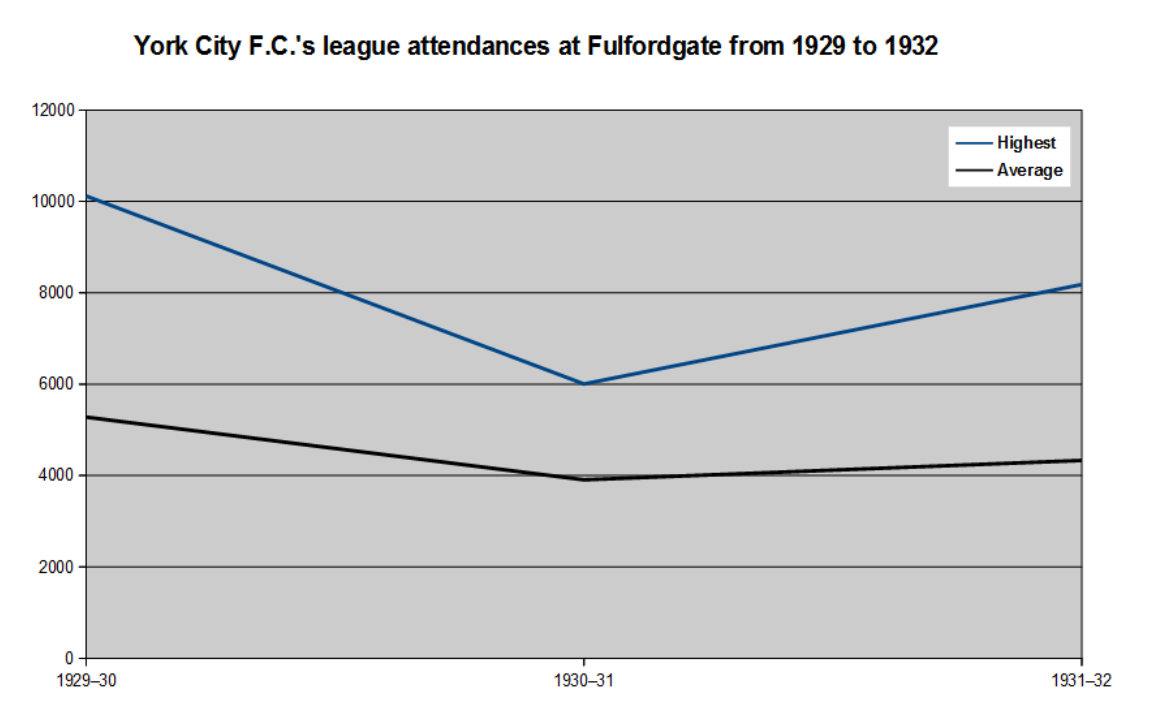
York's highest and average league attendances at Fulfordgate from the 1929–30 to the 1931–32 seasons

The highest attendance at Fulfordgate before York's election into the Football League was 8,318 for a match between York Boys and Brighton Boys in an English Schools' Trophy semi-final on 12 May 1928. The record highest attendance at the ground was set on 14 January 1931, when 12,721 saw Sheffield United play York in an FA Cup third round replay. The highest attendance in the Football League was 10,120, for a Third Division North match against Port Vale on 21 April 1930. The record lowest attendance for a Football League match was 1,735, when York played New Brighton on 25 April 1931 in the Third Division North. The lowest attendance at the ground for any first-team fixture was 1,500 for an FA Cup preliminary round match against Maltby Main on 23 September 1925.

The highest seasonal average attendance at Fulfordgate whilst York were in the Football League was 5,279 in 1929–30. The lowest seasonal average attendance in the Football League was 3,906 in 1930–31. York's biggest margin of victory at Fulfordgate was by seven goals, when they recorded a 7–0 win over Alfreton Town in the Midland League on 11 September 1926. Their biggest margin of defeat at the ground was by three goals, when they were beaten 6–3 by Notts County reserves in the Midland League on 5 September 1928. The most goals scored in a match was 10 on 23 February 1929, when York defeated Worksop Town 8–2 in the Midland League.
