= Ralph Ridley =

English footballer

Personal information
- Full name: Ralph Henry Ridley
- Date of birth: 14 April 1904
- Place of birth: Haltwhistle, Northumberland, England
- Height: 5 ft 10 in (1.78 m)
- Position: Goalkeeper

Senior career*
Years	Team	Apps	(Gls)
–1924	Chopwell		
1924–1929	Ashington	74	(0)
1929–1932	York City	46	(0)
1932–????	Consett		
Total		120+	(0+)
- * Club domestic league appearances and goals

Ralph Henry Ridley (14 April 1904 – ?) was an English professional footballer who played as a goalkeeper in the Football League for Ashington and York City and in non-League football for Chopwell and Consett.
