= 1932–33 Arsenal F.C. season =

English football club season

Arsenal
1932–33 season
- Chairman: Samuel Hill-Wood
- Manager: Herbert Chapman
- Stadium: Highbury
- First Division: 1st
- FA Cup: Third Round

The 1932–33 season was Arsenal's 14th consecutive season in the top division of English football. For the second time in three years they won the league title, clinching it at Chelsea with a 3–1 win. They finished four points clear of Aston Villa but went out of the FA Cup at lower-league Walsall. Over the course of the season, Arsenal inflicted a number of heavy defeats, including 6–1 versus Sunderland, 8–2 against Leicester City, 7–1 at Wolverhampton Wanderers, 9–2 against Sheffield United at Highbury, and 8–0 against Blackburn Rovers. The Gunners also beat title rivals Villa 5–0 at Highbury in April, though lost 5–3 away in November. Arsenal's top scorer was Cliff Bastin, who netted 33 goals-all off them in the league.

== Results ==
Arsenal's score comes first

=== Legend ===
Win	Draw	Loss

=== Football League First Division ===
Date	Opponent	Venue	Result	Attendance	Scorers
27 August 1932	Birmingham	A	1–0	31,592	
31 August 1932	West Bromwich Albion	H	1–2	46,743	
3 September 1932	Sunderland	H	6–1	28,896	
10 September 1932	Manchester City	A	3–2	36,542	
14 September 1932	West Bromwich Albion	A	1–1	54,098	
17 September 1932	Bolton Wanderers	H	3–2	42,395	
24 September 1932	Everton	H	2–1	51,182	
1 October 1932	Blackpool	A	2–1	30,218	
8 October 1932	Derby County	H	3–3	32,055	
15 October 1932	Blackburn Rovers	A	3–2	28,799	
22 October 1933	Liverpool	A	3–2	38,548	
29 October 1932	Leicester City	H	8–2	36,714	
5 November 1932	Wolverhampton Wanderers	A	7–1	43,570	
12 November 1932	Newcastle United	H	1–0	56,498	
19 November 1932	Aston Villa	A	3–5	58,066	
26 November 1932	Middlesbrough	H	4–2	34,640	
3 December 1932	Portsmouth	A	3–1	31,401	
10 December 1932	Chelsea	H	4–1	53,206	
17 December 1932	Huddersfield Town	A	1–0	23,198	
24 December 1932	Sheffield United	H	9–2	41,520	
26 December 1932	Leeds United	H	1–2	55,876	
27 December 1932	Leeds United	A	0–0	56,776	
31 December 1932	Birmingham	H	3–0	37,800	
2 January 1933	Sheffield Wednesday	A	2–3	64,492	
7 January 1933	Sunderland	A	2–3	36,707	
21 January 1933	Manchester City	H	2–1	32,456	
1 February 1933	Bolton Wanderers	A	4–0	13,401	
4 February 1933	Everton	A	1–1	55,463	
11 February 1933	Blackpool	H	1–1	35,180	
22 February 1933	Derby County	A	2–2	23,148	
25 February 1933	Blackburn Rovers	H	8–0	27,576	
4 March 1933	Liverpool	H	0–1	42,868	
11 March 1933	Leicester City	A	1–1	32,228	
18 March 1933	Wolverhampton Wanderers	H	1–2	44,711	
25 March 1933	Newcastle United	A	1–2	51,215	
1 April 1933	Aston Villa	H	5–0	54,265	
8 April 1933	Middlesbrough	A	4–3	22,137	
14 April 1933	Sheffield Wednesday	H	4–2	61,945	
15 April 1933	Portsmouth	H	2–0	42,809	
22 April 1933	Chelsea	A	3–1	72,260	
29 April 1933	Huddersfield Town	H	2–2	30,779	
6 May 1933	Sheffield United	A	1–3	18,620	

==== Final League table ====
Pos	Team	Pld	W	D	L	GF	GA	GAv	Pts
1	Arsenal (C)	42	25	8	9	118	61	1.934	58
2	Aston Villa	42	23	8	11	92	67	1.373	54
3	Sheffield Wednesday	42	21	9	12	80	68	1.176	51
4	West Bromwich Albion	42	20	9	13	83	70	1.186	49
5	Newcastle United	42	22	5	15	71	63	1.127	49

Source: World Football
Rules for classification: 1) Points; 2) Goal average; 3) Goals scored
(C) Champions

=== FA Cup ===
Round	Date	Opponent	Venue	Result	Attendance	Goalscorers
R3	14 January 1933	Walsall	A	0–2	11,150	

== See also ==
- 1932–33 in English football
- List of Arsenal F.C. seasons
