= 1931–32 Arsenal F.C. season =

English football club season

Arsenal
1931–32 season
- Chairman: Samuel Hill-Wood
- Manager: Herbert Chapman
- Stadium: Highbury
- First Division: 2nd
- FA Cup: Finalists

The 1931–32 season was Arsenal's 13th consecutive season in the top division of English football.

== Results ==
Arsenal's score comes first

=== Legend ===
Win	Draw	Loss

=== Football League First Division ===
Date	Opponent	Venue	Result	Attendance	Scorers
29 August 1931	West Bromwich Albion	H	0–1	58,476	
31 August 1931	Blackburn Rovers	A	1–1	22,138	
5 September 1931	Birmingham	A	2–2	26,810	
9 September 1931	Portsmouth	H	3–3	25,403	
12 September 1931	Sunderland	H	2–0	22,926	
16 September 1931	Portsmouth	A	3–0	22,977	
19 September 1931	Manchester City	A	3–1	46,756	
26 September 1931	Everton	H	3–2	47,637	
3 October 1931	Grimsby Town	A	1–3	17,840	
10 October 1931	Blackpool	A	5–1	29,576	
17 October 1931	Bolton Wanderers	H	1–1	42,141	
24 October 1931	Leicester City	A	2–1	26,233	
31 October 1931	Aston Villa	H	1–1	54,951	
7 November 1931	Newcastle United	A	2–3	28,949	
14 November 1931	West Ham United	H	4–1	41,028	
21 November 1931	Chelsea	A	1–2	64,427	
28 November 1931	Liverpool	H	6–0	29,220	
5 December 1931	Sheffield Wednesday	A	3–1	27,265	
12 December 1931	Huddersfield Town	H	1–1	39,748	
19 December 1931	Middlesbrough	A	5–2	17,083	
25 December 1931	Sheffield United	A	1–4	49,737	
26 December 1931	Sheffield United	H	0–2	55,207	
2 January 1932	West Bromwich Albion	A	0–1	30,970	
16 January 1932	Birmingham	H	3–0	37,843	
30 January 1932	Manchester City	H	4–0	39,834	
6 February 1932	Everton	A	3–1	56,698	
17 February 1932	Grimsby Town	H	4–0	20,980	
20 February 1932	Blackpool	H	2–0	39,045	
2 March 1932	Bolton Wanderers	A	0–1	20,922	
5 March 1932	Leicester City	H	2–1	53,920	
19 March 1932	Newcastle United	H	1–0	57,516	
25 March 1932	Derby County	H	2–1	56,435	
26 March 1932	West Ham United	A	1–1	34,852	
28 March 1932	Derby County	A	1–1	25,790	
2 April 1932	Chelsea	H	1–1	56,124	
6 April 1932	Sunderland	A	0–2	30,443	
9 April 1932	Liverpool	A	1–2	30,100	
16 April 1932	Sheffield Wednesday	H	3–1	25,220	
25 April 1932	Aston Villa	A	1–1	25,959	
27 April 1932	Huddersfield Town	A	2–1	13,370	
30 April 1932	Middlesbrough	H	5–0	30,714	
7 May 1932	Blackburn Rovers	H	4–0	23,127	

==== Final League table ====
Pos	Team	Pld	W	D	L	GF	GA	GAv	Pts
1	Everton (C)	42	26	4	12	116	64	1.813	56
2	Arsenal	42	22	10	10	90	48	1.875	54
3	Sheffield Wednesday	42	22	6	14	96	82	1.171	50
4	Huddersfield Town	42	19	10	13	80	63	1.270	48
5	Aston Villa	42	19	8	15	104	72	1.444	46

Source: World Football
Rules for classification: 1) Points; 2) Goal average; 3) Goals scored
(C) Champions

=== FA Cup ===
Round	Date	Opponent	Venue	Result	Attendance	Goalscorers
R3	9 January 1932	Darwen	H	11–1	37,486	
R4	23 January 1932	Plymouth Argyle	H	4–2	65,386	
R5	13 February 1932	Portsmouth	A	2–0	38,918	
R6	27 February 1932	Huddersfield Town	A	1–0	67,037	
SF	12 March 1932	Manchester City	N	1–0	50,337	
F	23 April 1932	Newcastle United	N	1–2	92,298	

== See also ==
- 1931–32 in English football
- List of Arsenal F.C. seasons
