= Tom Smiles =

English footballer

Personal information
- Full name: Thomas W. Smiles
- Place of birth: England
- Position: Inside forward

Senior career*
| Years | Team | Apps | (Gls) |
- 19th Regiment
| 1929–1930 | York City | 8 | (0) |
| Total | | 8 | (0) |
- * Club domestic league appearances and goals

Thomas W. Smiles was an English professional footballer who played as an inside forward in the Football League for York City, and in non-League football for 19th Regiment.
