= Sam Evans (footballer) =

Scottish footballer (born 1904)

Personal information
- Full name: Samuel Evans
- Date of birth: 8 February 1904
- Place of birth: Glasgow, Scotland
- Height: 5 ft 9 in (1.75 m)
- Position: Outside forward

Senior career*
Years	Team	Apps	(Gls)
–1925	Clydebank		
1923–1925	St Mirren	42	(2)
1925–1927	Clydebank (Note: The Clydebank appearances and goals only cover the 1925–26 season.)	37	(7)
1927–	Reading	13	(0)
–1929	Ballymena		
1929–1931	York City	66	(12)
1931–1932	Scarborough		
1932–????	Darlington	2	(0)
Total		160	(21)
- * Club domestic league appearances and goals

Samuel Evans (8 February 1904 – ?) was a Scottish professional footballer who played as an outside forward in Scottish football for Clydebank (two spells) and St Mirren, in the Football League for Reading, York City and Darlington, in non-League football for Scarborough and in Irish football for Ballymena.
