= Sam Gallacher =

Scottish footballer

Personal information
- Full name: Samuel Gallacher
- Date of birth: 23 December 1904
- Place of birth: Annbank, Scotland
- Position: Centre half

Youth career
- Larkfield Juniors

Senior career*
Years	Team	Apps	(Gls)
- Cadzow St. Anne's
1924–1927	Bradford City	40	(2)
1927–1928	Crystal Palace	0	(0)
1928–1929	Lincoln City	13	(0)
1929	York City	3	(0)
Total		56	(2)
- * Club domestic league appearances and goals

Samuel Gallacher (born 23 December 1904) was a Scottish professional footballer who played as a centre half.

== Career ==
Born in Annbank, Gallacher played for Larkfield Juniors and Cadzow St. Anne's in his native Scotland, before moving to England to join Bradford City in May 1924. For Bradford City he made 40 appearances in the Football League, scoring 2 goals. He left the club in August 1927 to join Crystal Palace.

He later played for Lincoln City, making 13 appearances in the Football League as well as one FA Cup appearance for them, before joining York City.

== Bibliography ==
- Frost, Terry (1988). Bradford City A Complete Record 1903-1988. Breedon Books Sport. ISBN 0-907969-38-0.
- Joyce, Michael (2004). Football League Players' Records 1888 to 1939. Nottingham: Tony Brown. ISBN 1-899468-67-6.
