= Harry Beck (footballer) =

English footballer

Personal information
- Full name: Henry Alfred Beck
- Date of birth: 21 February 1901
- Place of birth: Walsall Wood, England
- Date of death: 1979 (aged 77–78)
- Height: 5 ft 7 1/2 in (1.71 m)
- Positions: Centre half; wing half

Senior career*
Years	Team	Apps	(Gls)
- Rushall
1921	Walsall	3	(1)
- Darlaston
- Cannock Town
- Burton Town
1921–1927	Walsall	40	(0)
- Stafford Rangers
1928	Barrow	29	(0)
1929–1932	York City	119	(12)
1932–1933	Wrexham	30	(2)
- Glentoran
- Dudley Town
- * Club domestic league appearances and goals

Henry Alfred "Harry" Beck, (21 February 1901 – 1979) also known as Harold Beck, was an English footballer who played in the Football League for Walsall, Barrow, York City and Wrexham.
