= Springfield Park (Wigan) =

Stadium in Wigan, Greater Manchester, UK

Coordinates: 53°33′17.69″N 2°39′02.38″W

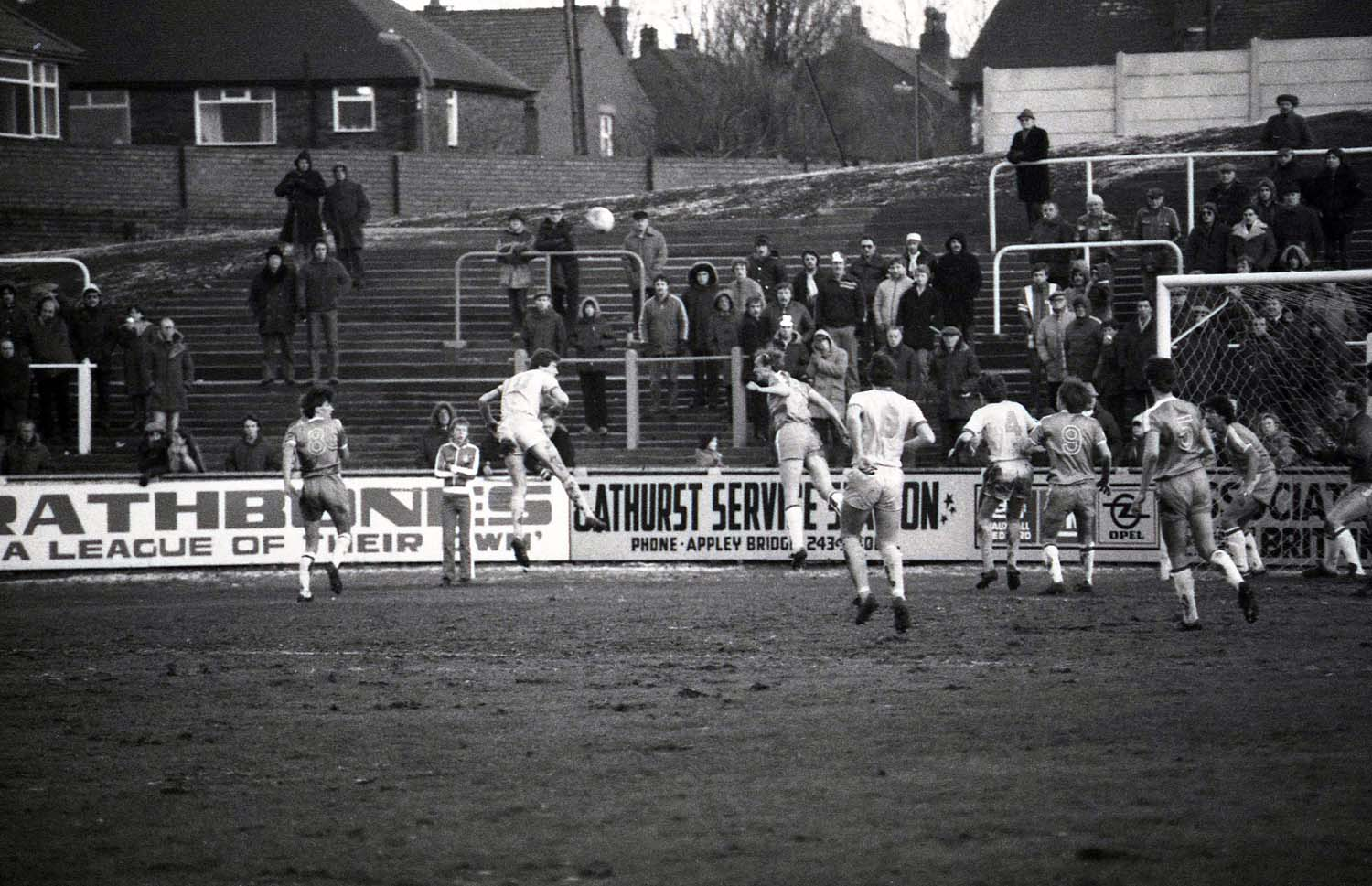
- The Town End at Springfield Park in 1982
- Interactive map of Springfield Park
- Location: Wigan
- Owner: The Wigan Trotting and Athletic Grounds Company Ltd. (1896–1899); The Royal London Friendly Society. (1899–); Wigan Athletic (1932–1999)
- Capacity: 40,000 (maximum)
- Surface: Grass

Construction
- Opened: 1897
- Closed: 1999
- Demolished: 1999
- Cost: £16,000
- Architect: Richardson Thomas Johnson
- Builders: Winnard and Weston

Tenants
- Wigan Athletic (1932–1999); Wigan County (1897–1900); Wigan United (1901–1903) & (1919–1920); Wigan Town (1905–1908); Wigan Borough (1920–1932); Wigan Warriors (1901–1902); Springfield Borough (1987–1988)

Springfield Park was a multi-purpose stadium in Wigan, Greater Manchester. It was the home ground of Wigan Athletic F.C. until the club moved to the new JJB Stadium (now The Brick Stadium) after the 1998–99 season. At its largest, the stadium held 40,000. In its 102-year existence the ground only saw 32 years as a Football League venue, 11 years for Wigan Borough F.C. and 21 years for Wigan Athletic FC, before it was demolished to make way for a housing estate in 1999.

The stadium had previously been home to Wigan County, Wigan United, Wigan Town, and Wigan Borough (previously Wigan United and Wigan Association) as well as Wigan and Springfield Borough rugby league sides. It was also used for horse trotting, as a track cycling velodrome, for wrestling and for athletics.

Springfield Park was designed by architect Richardson Thomas Johnson and built in 1897 at a cost of £16,000. It was owned by The Wigan Trotting and Athletic Grounds Company Ltd. The first professional football match at the stadium took place in September 1897 when Wigan County played Burton Swifts in a friendly match.

== Association Football ==
=== History ===
Wigan County were the first team to play at Springfield Park. Their greatest event was a 1–0 loss at the hands of Manchester City before their liquidation and extinction three years after their 1897 formation. Wigan United took the lease at Springfield Park in 1901, competing for two seasons in the Lancashire League. After being drawn away to Stalybridge Rovers in the third round of the Rawcliffe Cup, they declined to play due to a waterlogged pitch. However, the referee ruled otherwise, leaving Stalybridge to kick off, dribble and place the ball into the net. Wigan Town was the third attempt to establish football in Wigan in 1905, but it too failed to survive for more than three years.

After a period of inactivity at Springfield Park due to the First World War, Wigan United beat Fleetwood 2–0 on 6 September 1919 in the West Lancs League. This was the first official game after the war and would lead to the club taking the lease for the ground on 2 December 1919 for the rest of the season. United eventually became Wigan Borough F.C. in 1920 and became one of the founder members of the Football League Third Division North. They won their first game, against Nelson, 2–1 in front of 9,000 spectators. The club's best performance was in 1928–29 when they reached the Third round of the FA Cup. This was to be the largest attendance ever recorded at Springfield Park, with 30,443 spectators watching a 3–1 loss to Sheffield Wednesday.

Wigan Borough resigned from the football league during the 1931–32 season. Shortly after Borough went out of business, a new club, Wigan Athletic F.C., was formed and continued to play their home games at Springfield Park. After lengthy negotiations, Wigan Athletic purchased the ground from the owner of Woodhouse Lane Stadium for £2,800 with the proviso that greyhound racing never take place at Springfield Park.

During the 1952–53 season, the main stand was razed to the ground by fire, resulting in major fundraising efforts for the construction of a new stand. The following season, a record crowd of 27,526 watched Wigan Athletic beat Hereford United 4–1. To this day, it is the largest attendance ever recorded between two non-league clubs excluding Wembley finals.

19 October 1966 marked the first floodlit match at Springfield Park, when Wigan Athletic played Crewe Alexandra. This was a full year before floodlights were installed at Central Park.

On 24 March 1972, Springfield Park was used for the annual amateur international between England and Scotland with England, featuring Dave Bassett and Wayne Rooney's uncle, Billy Morrey, winning 4-0 in front of a record crowd for an England-Scotland amateur game of 2,704.

In October 1978, Zambia –coached by Brian Tiler, himself an ex-Latics manager– became the first professional national team to play at Springfield Park. Wigan won the game 2–1.

Wigan Athletic F.C. moved to the new JJB Stadium after the 1999 season. The final competitive goal to be scored at the stadium was by Manchester City's Paul Dickov.

=== Attendances ===
==== Wigan Borough ====
===== Football League =====
1. Stockport County, 1 April 1929. Division 3 North: 15,162
2. Accrington Stanley, 14 October 1922. Division 3 North: 13,000
3. Rochdale, 27 August 1923. Division 3 North: 13,000
4. Bradford City, 1 September 1928. Division 3 North: 12,646

===== Other =====
1. Sheffield Wednesday, 12 January 1929. FA Cup round 3: 30,433

==== Wigan Athletic ====
===== Football League =====
1. Bolton Wanderers, 26 December 1983. Division 3: 10,045
2. Plymouth Argyle, 19 April 1986. Division 3: 9,485
3. Barnsley, 3 March 1979. Division 4: 9,427

===== Other =====
1. Hereford United, 1953–54. FA Cup round 2: 27,526 (record attendance for a match between two non-league teams at a non-league ground)
2. Newcastle United, 1953–54. FA Cup round 3: 26,500
3. Millwall, 1934–35. FA Cup round 3: 25,304

==== Neutral Venue ====
1. Newcastle United -v- Cardiff City, 2 October 1922. Whitehaven Pit Disaster Fund: 15,000

== Rugby League ==
Wigan RLFC were briefly sub-tenants of Springfield Park (which they shared with Wigan United who had playing preference) playing their first game there on 14 September 1901. A crowd of 4,123 saw them beat Morecambe 12–0. The club's record crowd at Springfield was 10,111, a victory over Widnes on 19 March 1902. The last game was on 28 April 1902 when Wigan beat a Rest of Lancashire Senior Competition representative team. Wigan then moved to Central Park.

Springfield Borough played at Springfield Park for a single season. Renamed from Blackpool Borough and relocated after their Borough Park home closed in 1987, the club finished fourth in the second division before more changes, becoming Chorley Borough at Victory Park in 1988.

== Cycling ==
The concrete cycle track featured a home straight 29 feet (8.8 m) wide, while the banking was 24 feet (7.3 m) wide, rising 7 feet (2.1 m). It was used regularly for competitions; local racing cyclists who raced there included Benjamin Jones, who competed in the 1908 London Olympic Games winning two gold medals.
