= Wigan Town A.F.C. =

Wigan Town
- Full name: Wigan Town Association Football Club
- Nickname: The Town
- Founded: 1905
- Dissolved: May 1908
- Ground: Springfield Park
- Capacity: 30,000 (approx)
- Secretary: Robert Charnley
- Trainer: Fred Fairhurst
- League: The Combination, Lancashire Combination
Home colours

Wigan Town A.F.C. was an association football club from Wigan, Lancashire which operated between July 1905 and May 1908.

== History ==
The first public appearance of the club was an exhibition match between the Probables (made up of local men) and the Possibles (players from further afield, brought together by Mr Dale, a committee member) on Christmas Day 1905, which attracted 8,000 to Springfield Park, suggesting that there was a potential strong following for the association game in a rugby league stronghold.

The first game Town played was a friendly against Hull City on 30 December 1905 which it lost 5–7. In January 1906 they were admitted to The Combination where they took over the fixtures of Middlewich F.C. who had folded. The club finished bottom of the league adding only 5 points to total achieved by the club they replaced. Nevertheless, the club applied to join the Football League, club secretary Charnley - the son of the Football League secretary - stating at the re-election meeting that it would be willing to spend £2,000 on the side; however, the bid only gained 5 votes, with 21 votes required to oust Clapton Orient.

The 1906–07 season was the most successful with a third-place finish in the Combination. In January 1907 the club was suspended "sine die" for "supposed wrong treatment of certain players" which amounted to unpaid wages to three members of the playing staff. The ban was lifted after a couple of weeks when the debts were settled. Scotsman, James Harold was appointed manager in February 1907 and he arranged friendly matches at Springfield Park with Preston North End, Sheffield United, Stoke, Birmingham, and Aston Villa, all First Division clubs at the time. At the end of this season Town successfully gained entry to the Lancashire Combination Division 2, but failed in an attempt to gain entry to the Football League Division 2 for the second consecutive season.

The final season, 1907–08, started with the club placing a bond of £20 with the Lancashire Combination as a guarantee that Town would fulfil all their commitments in the coming nine months, such was the belief that the club would fold during the season. Early results were good until James Harold left in October 1907 from which point the club went into freefall with huge defeats including 12–0 against Colne, 8–0 versus Nelson and 10–1 against Haslingden after the new year. In January 1908 a reporter for the Wigan Examiner accused Wigan Rugby League Club of having a "pre-determination to bring a clashing engagement with every home fixture of the Town" in order to put them out of business. In April of the same year, club treasurer, J. Yarwood, announced a scheme which invited "the working men of Wigan and District" to pay a subscription towards the formation of a new club; this too failed to capture the attention of the public and was wound up in June 1908 with all monies returned.

On 21 May 1908, it was announced that Wigan Town had not applied for re-election to the Lancashire Combination after finishing next to bottom of the league that season. It is assumed that they folded around this time as there is no record of a return for the 1908–09 competition.

== Colours ==
In the opening Probables v Possibles match, the Probables wore blue and white striped shirts, and the Possibles donned an Aston Villa-style claret with blue sleeves. At some point the club seems to have adopted red shirts with white trim, but for 1907–08 the club wore black and white stripes.

== Ground ==
The club played at Springfield Park.

== Records ==
- FA Cup
  - Preliminary Round 1907–08
- Highest league position
  - The Combination: 3rd, 1906–07
