= Wigan Borough F.C. =

Former association football club in England

Wigan Borough
- Full name: Wigan Borough Football Club
- Nickname: The 'Boro – The Green Linnets
- Founded: December 1920 after being known as Wigan United and Wigan Association
- Dissolved: 1931
- Ground: Springfield Park
- Capacity: 30,000 (approx)
- League: Football League North
Home colours

Wigan Borough Football Club was an English football club from the town of Wigan, Lancashire. their forerunners were Wigan A.F.C., Wigan County, Wigan United and Wigan Town, County and Town having folded.

== Beginnings ==
Following the First World War, a new amateur club, Wigan United, (Note: The club has no direct relation to the Wigan United which existed in the early 1900s.) was formed in 1919. United played 18 games in the 1919–20 season as members of the West Lancashire League and also entered the Richardson Cup. The club applied to join the Lancashire Combination for the 1920–21 season and continued as Wigan United for a further nine games (P9 L9) before being forced to close by the Lancashire FA as they were found guilty of paying their players for "lost time", which contravened rules of the time. A new club, Wigan Association, was formed on 6 November 1920, taking over the fixtures of Wigan United for four games (P4 D1 L3). After this short period the F.A. agreed that all their demands had been met with the exception that the club would have to change their name again to avoid confusion with Wigan FC, the town's rugby league team, resulting in Wigan Association becoming known as Wigan Borough Football Club in December 1920. The newly named Wigan Borough applied for entrance to the football league's Third Division North for the 1921–22 season, despite only finishing 17th of 18 clubs in the Lancashire Combination league. Astonishingly, they were, along with Barrow and Accrington Stanley, granted a place for the inaugural season of the competition.

== Life in the Football League ==
Borough's first match as a league club came against Arsenal in a friendly, which they won 2–1. Their first league match saw them fight back from 1–0 down to win 2–1 against Nelson, but they would go on to finish only 17th of 20 in their début season. They spent ten years at this level before resigning from the league during the 1931–32 season.

Boro's most successful season came in 1928–29 when they finished fourth in the Third Division North League; however at the time only the regional champions were promoted. Also that season they reached the Third Round of the FA Cup, the furthest Borough would ever progress in the competition. Though they lost the match against Sheffield Wednesday 3–1, a Springfield Park record 30,443 crowd saw the game.

In 1931, the effects of the Great Depression proved too much and, unable to pay the players' wages any longer, Wigan Borough went out of business on 26 October 1931 with liabilities of £30,000. In truth the club had only made a profit for one year since they had been in the Football League. The last four players Doran, Russell, Hartley and Hallam were given free transfers in mid-December. The following year, Wigan's Mayor chaired a public meeting at Queens Hall which resulted in the founding of Wigan Athletic. It would not be until 2 June 1978, however, that Wigan would have a side in the Football League once more, and four more years would be needed to restore third-tier football to the town.

== Club records ==
- Highest League Position: 4th, Football League Third Division North
- Largest win: 9–1 vs Lincoln (Football League Third Division North)
- Highest attendance: 30,443 vs Sheffield Wednesday (FA Cup Third Round)
