= 2007–08 York City F.C. season =

Association football club season

York City F.C.
2007–08 season
- Managing director: Jason McGill
- Manager: Billy McEwan (until 19 November 2007); Colin Walker (from 19 November 2007)
- Ground: Bootham Crescent
- Conference Premier: 14th
- FA Cup: First round (eliminated by Havant & Waterlooville)
- FA Trophy: Semi-final (eliminated by Torquay United)
- Conference League Cup: Northern section fifth round (eliminated by Northwich Victoria)
- Top goalscorer: League: Onome Sodje; Martyn Woolford (14); All: Onome Sodje; Martyn Woolford (17)
- Highest home attendance: 3,625 vs Torquay United, FA Trophy, 15 March 2008
- Lowest home attendance: 763 vs Northwich Victoria, Conference League Cup, 6 February 2008
- Average home league attendance: 2,258
Home colours	Away colours	Third colours

The 2007–08 season was the 86th season of competitive association football and fourth season in the Football Conference played by York City Football Club, a professional football club based in York, North Yorkshire, England. They finished in 17th place in the 24-team 2007–08 Conference Premier.

York entered the 2007–08 FA Cup in the fourth qualifying round, losing to Havant & Waterlooville at home. They reached the semi-final of the 2007–08 FA Trophy, being beaten by Torquay United. York were knocked out in the Northern section fifth round of the 2007–08 Conference League Cup, after a penalty shoot-out defeat at home to Northwich Victoria.

34 players made at least one appearance in nationally organised first-team competition, and there were 16 different goalscorers. Winger Martyn Woolford played in all 57 first-team matches over the season. Onome Sodje and Woolford finished as joint top scorers with 17 goals each. Sodje scored 14 in league competition, two in the FA Cup and one in the Conference League Cup, while Woolford scored 14 in league competition, two in the FA Trophy and one in the Conference League Cup. The winner of the Clubman of the Year award was David McGurk.

== Background and pre-season ==
York retained the previous season's home and away kits. The home kit included red shirts with a white collar, bar a section under the neck which was red, and white trims on the sleeves, white shorts and red socks. The away kit comprised yellow shirts with a green collar, bar a section under the neck which was yellow, and white trims on the sleeves, blue shorts and blue socks. A third kit was used this season, which included light blue shirts with a maroon collar, bar a section under the neck which was light blue, and maroon trims on the sleeves, maroon shorts and light blue socks. CLP Industries continued as shirt sponsors for the third successive season.

Pre-season match details
Date	Opponents	Venue	Result	Score F–A	Scorers	Attendance	Ref.
13 July 2007	Leeds United	H	D	0–0		4,019	
18 July 2007	Newcastle Benfield	A	W	3–1	Woolford (2), Panther		
21 July 2007	Doncaster Rovers	H	L	3–4	Sodje (2) 52', 72', Beardsley 64'	1,247	
25 July 2007	Frickley Athletic	A	D	1–1	Sodje 20'		
28 July 2007	Bradford City	H	W	1–0	Beardsley 31'	1,073	
1 August 2007	Sheffield	A	W	5–0	Brodie (2), Elliott, Sodje, Panther		
4 August 2007	Chesterfield	H	W	2–1	Farrell 42', Sodje 76'	766	

== Match details ==
Dates are sourced by Batters. League positions are sourced by Statto. The remaining information is referenced individually.

=== Conference Premier ===
Conference Premier match details
Date	League position	Opponents	Venue	Result	Score F–A	Scorers	Attendance	Ref.
11 August 2007	17th	Cambridge United	H	L	1–2	Farrell 38' pen.	3,136	
14 August 2007	23rd	Burton Albion	A	L	3–4	Woolford 45', Sodje 48', Farrell 52' pen.	1,892	
20 August 2007	21st	Exeter City	A	D	1–1	Sodje 87'	4,242	
24 August 2007	22nd	Forest Green Rovers	H	L	0–2		2,294	
27 August 2007	18th	Northwich Victoria	A	W	1–0	Brayson 90'	1,302	
30 August 2007	18th	Rushden & Diamonds	H	L	2–3	Brodie 20', Woolford 54'	2,044	
4 September 2007	20th	Altrincham	H	D	2–2	Brodie 45', Brayson 51'	2,079	
8 September 2007	20th	Kidderminster Harriers	A	L	0–3		1,589	
15 September 2007	20th	Stevenage Borough	H	L	0–2		2,052	
18 September 2007	20th	Aldershot Town	A	L	0–2		2,402	
22 September 2007	20th	Grays Athletic	A	W	2–0	Sodje 44', Elliott 65'	1,014	
27 September 2007	19th	Halifax Town	H	W	3–2	Sodje 58', Woolford 61', Meechan 70'	2,134	
30 September 2007	19th	Oxford United	A	D	1–1	Sodje 81'	4,944	
6 October 2007	19th	Histon	H	L	1–4	Wroe 29'	2,199	
9 October 2007	19th	Stafford Rangers	H	W	2–0	Elliott 36', McBreen 39'	1,784	
13 October 2007	18th	Woking	A	W	3–0	Sodje (2) 4', 49', Woolford 71'	1,557	
21 October 2007	19th	Torquay United	H	L	0–1		2,483	
4 November 2007	19th	Farsley Celtic	A	W	4–1	McBreen 8', Brayson 23', Farrell (2) 81', 87'	1,603	
17 November 2007	19th	Salisbury City	H	L	1–3	Brayson 35'	2,303	
24 November 2007	16th	Weymouth	A	W	2–1	Kelly 53', Farrell 61'	1,566	
1 December 2007	17th	Crawley Town	H	D	1–1	Sodje 79'	2,212	
8 December 2007	14th	Ebbsfleet United	A	W	2–1	Sodje' 26, Woolford 50'	933	
26 December 2007	12th	Droylsden	H	W	2–1	Farrell 23' pen., Kelly 53'	3,042	
29 December 2007	10th	Weymouth	H	W	2–0	Woolford 51', McGurk 74'	2,546	
1 January 2008	10th	Droylsden	A	W	4–3	Panther 70', Farrell 87', Brodie (2) 90', 90+1'	1,015	
5 January 2008	10th	Kidderminster Harriers	H	D	2–2	Sodje 31', Farrell 34'	2,423	
19 January 2008	13th	Altrincham	A	D	2–2	Woolford (2) 63', 65'	1,210	
26 January 2008	11th	Aldershot Town	H	W	2–0	Brodie 7', Woolford 86'	3,092	
9 February 2008	10th	Grays Athletic	H	W	2–0	Wroe 53' pen., Fortune-West 72'	2,531	
12 February 2008	10th	Halifax Town	A	D	2–2	Sodje 33', Woolford 72'	2,875	
16 February 2008	11th	Histon	A	L	1–3	Wroe 19' pen.	1,021	
1 March 2008	11th	Cambridge United	A	L	0–2		3,666	
4 March 2008	11th	Burton Albion	H	D	0–0		1,882	
10 March 2008	11th	Exeter City	H	W	3–2	Woolford 31', Parslow 41', Sodje 69'	1,567	
18 March 2008	11th	Forest Green Rovers	A	W	2–1	Wroe 16', Robinson 40'	734	
22 March 2008	10th	Rushden & Diamonds	A	D	1–1	Brodie 55'	1,423	
25 March 2008	11th	Northwich Victoria	H	D	1–1	Brodie 11'	1,941	
29 March 2008	13th	Ebbsfleet United	H	L	0–1		2,256	
1 April 2008	13th	Stevenage Borough	A	L	2–3	Wroe (2) 25', 31' pen.	1,717	
5 April 2008	14th	Crawley Town	A	L	1–6	Woolford 27'	862	
8 April 2008	13th	Stafford Rangers	A	W	4–0	Woolford 53', Brodie 58', Elliott 78', Robinson 90'	455	
12 April 2008	14th	Woking	H	L	2–3	Sodje (2) 3', 57'	2,246	
15 April 2008	14th	Oxford United	H	L	0–1		1,808	
19 April 2008	14th	Torquay United	A	D	0–0		2,165	
22 April 2008	14th	Farsley Celtic	H	W	4–1	Woolford 11', Fortune-West 20', Brodie (2) 84', 90'	1,886	
26 April 2008	14th	Salisbury City	A	L	0–3		1,400	

=== League table (part) ===
Final Conference Premier table (part)
Pos	Club	Pld	W	D	L	F	A	GD	Pts
12th	Salisbury City	46	18	14	14	70	60	+10	68
13th	Kidderminster Harriers	46	19	10	17	74	57	+17	67
14th	York City	46	17	11	18	71	74	−3	62
15th	Crawley Town	46	19	9	18	73	67	+6	60
16th	Rushden & Diamonds	46	15	14	17	55	55	0	59
Key	Pos = League position; Pld = Matches played; W = Matches won; D = Matches drawn; L = Matches lost; F = Goals for; A = Goals against; GD = Goal difference; Pts = Points								
Source									

=== FA Cup ===
FA Cup match details
Round	Date	Opponents	Venue	Result	Score F–A	Scorers	Attendance	Ref.
Fourth qualifying round	27 October 2007	Rushall Olympic	H	W	6–0	Sodje (2) 18', 71', Farrell (3) 78,' 85', 88', Wroe 90'	1,630	
First round	10 November 2007	Havant & Waterlooville	H	L	0–1		2,001	

=== FA Trophy ===
FA Trophy match details
Round	Date	Opponents	Venue	Result	Score F–A	Scorers	Attendance	Ref.
First round	15 December 2007	Altrincham	A	W	3–1	Farrell 56', Lloyd 62', Wroe 87'	752	
Second round	12 January 2008	Grays Athletic	H	D	1–1	Farrell 75' pen.	1,351	
Second round replay	22 January 2008	Grays Athletic	A	W	4–1	Wroe (2) 35', 49', Woolford 58', Brodie 67' pen.	528	
Third round	3 February 2008	Farsley Celtic	A	W	2–0	Woolford 49', Farrell 89'	952	
Fourth round	23 February 2008	Rushden & Diamonds	A	W	1–0	Parslow 16'	1,626	
Semi-final first leg	7 March 2008	Torquay United	A	L	0–2		2,286	
Semi-final second leg	15 March 2008	Torquay United	H	W	1–0; 1–2 agg.	Todd 64' o.g.	3,625	

=== Conference League Cup ===
Conference League Cup match details
Round	Date	Opponents	Venue	Result	Score F–A	Scorers	Attendance	Ref.
Northern section fourth round	22 December 2007	Stafford Rangers	A	W	2–0	Brodie 99', Sodje 120'	515	
Northern section fifth round	6 February 2008	Northwich Victoria	H	D	3–3 a.e.t. 2–3 pens.	Brodie (2) 55', 101', Woolford 64'	763	

== Transfers ==
=== In ===
Date	Player	Club†	Fee	Ref.
16 May 2007	Ben Purkiss	Gainsborough Trinity	Undisclosed	
18 June 2007	Mark Robinson	(Torquay United)	Free	
18 June 2007	Onome Sodje	(Ebbsfleet United)	Free	
19 June 2007	Chris Beardsley	(Rushden & Diamonds)	Free	
25 June 2007	Paul Brayson	(Northwich Victoria)	Free	
25 June 2007	Stuart Elliott	(Northwich Victoria)	Free	
6 July 2007	Phil Turnbull	(Hartlepool United)	Free	
10 July 2007	Alex Meechan	(Chester City)	Free	
7 August 2007	Carl Jones	(Hartlepool United)	Free	
10 August 2007	Joey Hutchinson	(Darlington)	Free	
29 August 2007	Darren Kelly	Derry City	Undisclosed	
29 August 2007	Nicky Wroe	(Hamilton Academical)	Free	
27 September 2007	Russell Fry	(Boston United)	Free	
27 September 2007	Anthony Lloyd	(Farsley Celtic)	Free	
7 January 2008	Simon Rusk	Northwich Victoria	Free	
10 January 2008	Jimmy Beadle	(Steinkjer)	Free	
28 January 2008	Josh Mimms	(Liverpool)	Free	

† Brackets around club names denote the player's contract with that club had expired before he joined York.

=== Out ===
Date	Player	Club†	Fee	Ref.
31 August 2007	Joey Hutchinson	(Harrogate Town)	Released	
5 November 2007	Alex Meechan	(Stalybridge Celtic)	Released	
28 January 2008	Chris Beardsley	Kettering Town	Free	
30 January 2008	Paul Brayson	(Gateshead)	Released	
30 January 2008	Chaz Wrigley	(Rufforth)	Released	
31 January 2008	Carl Jones	(Gateshead)	Released	
15 February 2008	Russell Fry	(North Ferriby United)	Released	
15 March 2008	Phil Turnbull	(Gateshead)	Released	
24 April 2008	Darren Craddock	(Newcastle Blue Star)	Released	
24 April 2008	Stuart Elliott	(Grays Athletic)	Released	
24 April 2008	Tom Evans	(Alfreton Town)	Released	
26 April 2008	Ross Greenwood	(Gainsborough Trinity)	Released	
26 April 2008	Anthony Lloyd	(Guiseley)	Released	
26 April 2008	Manny Panther	(Exeter City)	Released	
26 April 2008	Alex Rhodes	(Bridlington Town)	Released	
28 May 2008	Nicky Wroe	Torquay United	Undisclosed	

† Brackets around club names denote the player joined that club after his York contract expired.

=== Loans in ===
Date	Player	Club	Return	Ref.
10 August 2007	Carl Pentney	Leicester City	8 September 2007	
31 August 2007	Stephen Henderson	Bristol City	1 October 2007	
13 September 2007	Nick Hegarty	Grimsby Town	13 October 2007	
3 October 2007	Josh Mimms	Liverpool	Made permanent 28 January 2008	
4 October 2007	Daniel McBreen	Scunthorpe United	5 November 2007	
31 January 2008	Leo Fortune-West	Cambridge United	End of season	
19 February 2008	Sam Duncum	Rotherham United	22 April 2008	
27 March 2008	Chris Hall	Gainsborough Trinity	End of season	

=== Loans out ===
Date	Player	Club	Return	Ref.
16 November 2007	Russell Fry	North Ferriby United	2 February 2008	
21 November 2007	Carl Jones	Gateshead	Released 31 January 2008	
28 December 2007	Alex Rhodes	Bridlington Town	23 January 2008	
31 December 2007	Chris Beardsley	Kettering Town	Made permanent 28 January 2008	
18 January 2008	Ross Greenwood	Gainsborough Trinity	End of season	
28 January 2008	Alex Rhodes	Whitby Town	One-month	
18 February 2008	Phil Turnbull	Gateshead	Released 15 March 2008	
27 March 2008	Alex Rhodes	Bridlington Town	One-month	

== Appearances and goals ==
Numbers in parentheses denote appearances as substitute.
Players with names struck through and marked † left the club during the playing season.
Players with names in italics and marked * were on loan from another club for the whole of their season with York.
Players listed with no appearances have been in the matchday squad but only as unused substitutes.
Key to positions: GK – Goalkeeper; DF – Defender; MF – Midfielder; FW – Forward

Players included in matchday squads
No.	Pos.	Nat.	Name	League		FA Cup		FA Trophy		CL Cup		Total		Discipline	
No.	Pos.	Nat.	Name	Apps	Goals	Apps	Goals	Apps	Goals	Apps	Goals	Apps	Goals	A yellow rectangle, denoting the yellow penalty card shown to a player being cautioned	A red rectangle, denoting the red penalty card shown to a player being sent off
1	GK	NIR	Tom Evans	36	0	2	0	7	0	2	0	47	0	0	1
2	DF	ENG	Darren Craddock	25 (5)	0	2	0	2 (1)	0	2	0	31 (6)	0	7	1
3	DF	ENG	Mark Robinson	28 (3)	2	2	0	1	0	0	0	31 (3)	2	1	1
4	MF	ENG	Stuart Elliott	32 (4)	3	2	0	6	0	1 (1)	0	41 (5)	3	8	2
5	DF	ENG	David McGurk	46	1	2	0	7	0	1	0	56	1	8	0
6	DF	WAL	Daniel Parslow	30 (1)	1	0	0	7	1	2	0	39 (1)	2	1	0
7	FW	NGR	Onome Sodje	29 (16)	14	2	2	4 (3)	0	1	1	36 (19)	17	2	0
8	MF	SCO	Manny Panther	36 (4)	1	2	0	6 (1)	0	1	0	45 (5)	1	3	0
9	FW	ENG	~~Paul Brayson~~ †	16 (6)	4	2	0	0 (1)	0	0	0	18 (7)	4	2	0
9	FW	ENG	Leo Fortune-West *	7 (6)	2	0	0	0	0	0	0	7 (6)	2	1	0
10	FW	ENG	Craig Farrell	13 (7)	8	1 (1)	3	5 (1)	3	2	0	21 (9)	14	0	0
11	MF	ENG	Martyn Woolford	45 (1)	14	2	0	7	2	2	1	56 (1)	17	2	0
12	FW	ENG	~~Chris Beardsley~~ †	4 (4)	0	0	0	0 (1)	0	0	0	4 (5)	0	1	0
12	MF	ENG	~~Sam Duncum~~ * †	1 (1)	0	0	0	0 (1)	0	0	0	1 (2)	0	0	0
13	GK	ENG	~~Carl Pentney~~ * †	0	0	0	0	0	0	0	0	0	0	0	0
13	GK	IRL	~~Stephen Henderson~~ * †	7	0	0	0	0	0	0	0	7	0	1	0
13	GK	ENG	Josh Mimms	3 (1)	0	0	0	0	0	0	0	3 (1)	0	0	0
14	MF	ENG	Ross Greenwood	4 (3)	0	0	0	0	0	0	0	4 (3)	0	1	0
15	FW	ENG	~~Alex Meechan~~ †	3 (4)	1	0	0	0	0	0	0	3 (4)	1	0	0
15	MF	SCO	Simon Rusk	10 (4)	0	0	0	0	0	0	0	10 (4)	0	3	0
16	FW	ENG	Richard Brodie	21 (18)	10	1 (1)	0	2 (3)	1	1 (1)	3	25 (23)	14	6	1
17	FW	ENG	Alex Rhodes	0	0	0 (2)	0	0	0	0	0	0 (2)	0	0	0
18	FW	ENG	Adam Boyes	0 (3)	0	0	0	0 (1)	0	0	0	0 (4)	0	0	0
19	MF	ENG	~~Phil Turnbull~~ †	0	0	0	0	0 (2)	0	1	0	1 (2)	0	0	0
19	MF	ENG	Chris Hall *	1 (1)	0	0	0	0	0	0	0	1 (1)	0	0	0
20	DF	ENG	~~Carl Jones~~ †	2	0	0	0	0	0	0	0	2	0	0	0
20	GK	ENG	Jonathan McDonald	0	0	0	0	0	0	0	0	0	0	0	0
21	MF	ENG	~~Joey Hutchinson~~ †	2 (1)	0	0	0	0	0	0	0	2 (1)	0	0	0
21	MF	ENG	~~Nick Hegarty~~ * †	2	0	0	0	0	0	0	0	2	0	0	0
21	MF	ENG	Jimmy Beadle	4	0	0	0	0	0	0	0	4	0	2	0
22	MF	ENG	Nicky Wroe	21 (8)	6	0 (2)	1	6 (1)	3	0 (2)	0	27 (13)	10	2	0
23	DF	ENG	Ben Purkiss	33 (4)	0	0	0	7	0	2	0	42 (4)	0	1	0
24	DF	ENG	Anthony Lloyd	11 (4)	0	0	0	6	1	2	0	19 (4)	1	1	0
25	DF	NIR	Darren Kelly	25 (2)	2	2	0	3	0	1	0	31 (2)	2	2	0
26	MF	ENG	~~Russell Fry~~ †	0 (4)	0	0	0	1	0	1	0	2 (4)	0	0	0
27	FW	AUS	~~Daniel McBreen~~ * †	5	2	0	0	0	0	0	0	5	2	1	0
28	DF	ENG	Andy McWilliams	4 (1)	0	0	0	0	0	0	0	4 (1)	0	0	0
29	MF	ENG	Liam Shepherd	0 (3)	0	0	0	0	0	0 (1)	0	0 (4)	0	0	0

Players not included in matchday squads
No.	Pos.	Nat.	Name
18	MF	ENG	~~Chaz Wrigley~~ †

== See also ==
- List of York City F.C. seasons
