= Russell Fry (footballer) =

English footballer

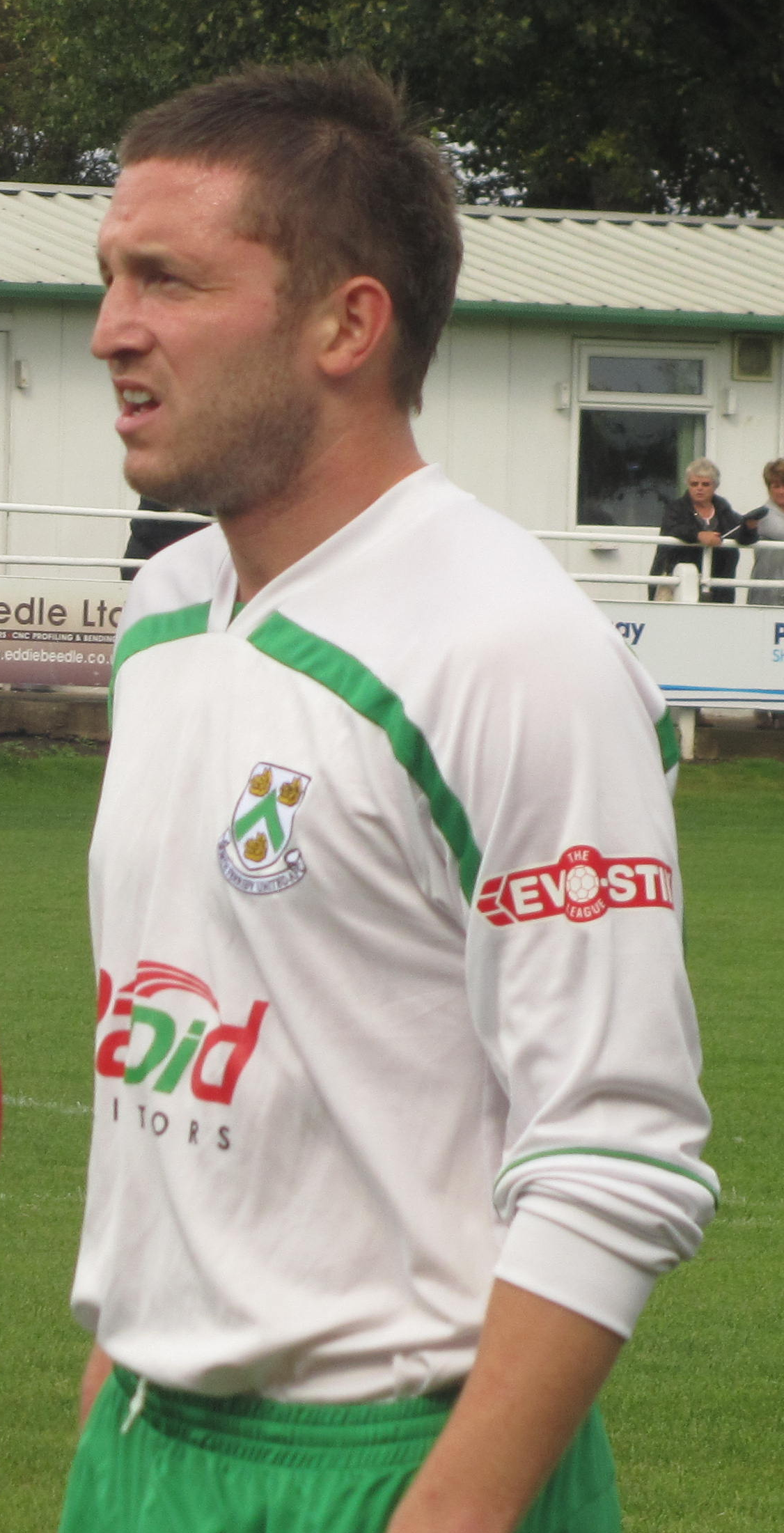
- Fry playing for North Ferriby United in 2011

Personal information
- Full name: Russell Harry Fry
- Date of birth: 4 December 1985 (age 40)
- Place of birth: Hull, England
- Height: 6 ft 2 in (1.88 m)
- Position: Midfielder

Team information
- Current team: North Ferriby United

Youth career
- ?–2002: Hull City

Senior career*
Years	Team	Apps	(Gls)
2002–2007	Hull City	2	(0)
2006	→ Halifax Town (loan)	4	(0)
2006–2007	→ Hinckley United (loan)	8	(1)
2007	Halifax Town	0	(0)
2007	Boston United	0	(0)
2007–2008	York City	4	(0)
2007–2008	→ North Ferriby United (loan)	10	(3)
2008–2018	North Ferriby United	337	(36)

International career^{‡}
	Wales U16	?	(?)
2005	England U20	1	(0)
- * Club domestic league appearances and goals as of 21:35, 6 July 2016 (UTC) ‡ National team caps and goals as of 00:56, 11 December 2012 (UTC)

Russell Harry Fry (born 4 December 1985) is an English retired footballer who played as a midfielder. He spent the majority of his career with North Ferriby United.

== Club career ==
Born in Hull, East Riding of Yorkshire, Fry came through Hull City's youth system. He made his first team debut as an 81st minute substitute for Scott Kerr in a 3–1 defeat at Port Vale in the Football League Trophy first round Northern section on 22 October 2002. He signed his first professional contract with Hull on 16 December. His league debut against Brentford in the final game of the 2004–05 season lasted only 32 minutes until he had to leave the pitch with an injury. He signed a new two-year contract with Hull in August 2005. Fry joined Conference National side Halifax Town on a one-month loan on 24 August 2006. This loan ended on 25 September Halifax allowed him to return to Hull, having made four appearances for the club. He joined Conference North side Hinckley United on loan in October 2006 and he finished the loan with nine appearances and one goal.

Fry was released by Hull in May 2007 and after trialling with newly-relegated League One club Leeds United during the summer he signed non-contract terms with Halifax on 9 August. He was an unused substitute in their first two games of the season before signing for Conference North club Boston United on non-contract terms later in August.

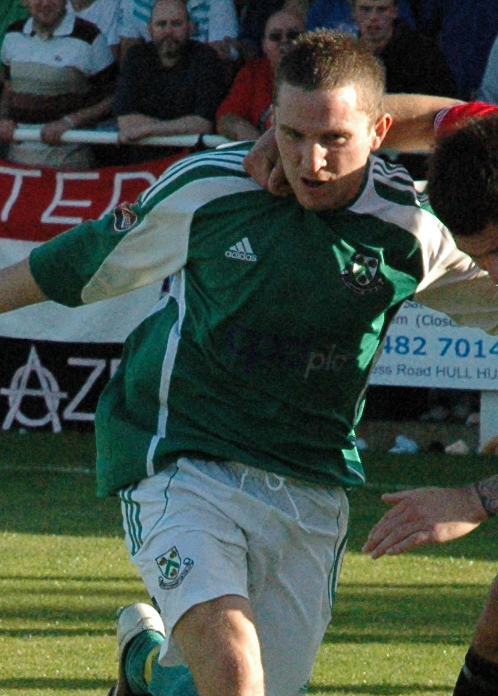
Fry playing for North Ferriby United in 2009

After being an unused substitute for Boston he opted to a move to Conference Premier team York City on non-contract terms, in pursuit of a permanent deal, on 15 September. He eventually signed a permanent contract at the club on 27 September. He joined Northern Premier League Premier Division team North Ferriby United on loan in November 2007. He made a scoring debut after netting the winning goal in the 45th minute of a 1–0 victory over Eastwood Town on 24 November. He returned to York after the loan concluded in January 2008, having made 11 appearances and scored 3 goals for Ferriby. His first start for York came playing as a wingback in a 2–0 victory at Farsley Celtic in the FA Trophy third round on 3 February. This was followed by a second successive start in a 3–3 draw after extra time with Northwich Victoria in the Conference League Cup fifth round Northern section on 6 February, which York lost 3–2 in a penalty shoot-out, although he was substituted in the 52nd minute.

Fry was released by York with immediate effect on 15 February 2008 allowing him to join North Ferriby permanently. He was nominated as a candidate for the Player of the Round award for the 2010–11 FA Cup third qualifying round for his performance against Vauxhall Motors, but eventually missed out to Justin Marsden of Nuneaton Town. North Ferriby were promoted to The Conference North League at the end of the 2012–13 season and narrowly missed out on a second successive promotion at the end of 2013–14 season. Fry received a special achievement award with North Ferriby after reaching 300 appearances during the 2013–14 season. Fry was part of the 2015 squad that took North Ferriby Utd to Wembley for the FA Trophy Final against Wrexham, in which North Ferriby won 5–4 on penalties to lift the Trophy in front of nearly 15,000 spectators.

== International career ==
Fry was named in the Wales national under-15 team for a game against Northern Ireland in November 2000. He later played for the under-16s before representing England at under-20 level, making his debut as a half-time substitute in a 4–0 defeat to Russia in a friendly on 16 August 2005.

== Career statistics ==
As of match played 28 April 2012

Appearances and goals by club, season and competition
Club	Season	League			FA Cup		League Cup		Other		Total	
Club	Season	Division	Apps	Goals	Apps	Goals	Apps	Goals	Apps	Goals	Apps	Goals
Hull City	2002–03	Third Division	0	0	0	0	0	0	1 (Note: Appearance in Football League Trophy)	0	1	0
Hull City	2003–04	Third Division	0	0	0	0	0	0	1	0	1	0
Hull City	2004–05	League One	1	0	1	0	0	0	0	0	2	0
Hull City	2005–06	Championship	1	0	0	0	0	0	0	0	1	0
Hull City	2006–07	Championship	0	0	0	0	0	0	0	0	0	0
Hull City	Total		2	0	1	0	0	0	2	0	5	0
Halifax Town (loan)	2006–07	Conference National	4	0	0	0	—		0	0	4	0
Hinckley United (loan)	2006–07	Conference North	8	1	0	0	—		1 (Note: Appearance in the FA Trophy)	0	9	1
Halifax Town	2007–08	Conference Premier	0	0	0	0	—		0	0	0	0
Boston United	2007–08	Conference North	0	0	0	0	—		0	0	0	0
York City	2007–08	Conference Premier	4	0	0	0	—		2 (Note: 1 appearance in FA Trophy, 1 in Conference League Cup)	0	6	0
North Ferriby United (loan)	2007–08	NPL Premier Division	10	3	0	0	—		1 (Note: Appearance in Northern Premier League Challenge Cup)	0	11	3
North Ferriby United	2007–08	NPL Premier Division	11	2	0	0	—		2 (Note: Appearances in East Riding Senior Cup)	0	13	2
North Ferriby United	2008–09	NPL Premier Division	38	12	3	1	—		8 (Note: 4 appearances in FA Trophy, 4 in East Riding Senior Cup)	2	49	15
North Ferriby United	2009–10	NPL Premier Division	33	4	2	0	—		9 (Note: 4 appearances in FA Trophy, 4 in East Riding Senior Cup, 1 in Northern Premier League Challenge Cup)	2	44	6
North Ferriby United	2010–11	NPL Premier Division	42	7	4	1	—		6 (Note: 1 appearance in FA Trophy, 3 in East Riding Senior Cup, 1 in Northern Premier League Challenge Cup, 1 in Northern Premier League Premier Division play-offs)	1	52	9
North Ferriby United	2011–12	NPL Premier Division	41	4	2	0	—		10 (Note: 5 appearances in FA Trophy, 4 in Northern Premier League Challenge Cup, 1 in East Riding Senior Cup)	5	53	9
North Ferriby United	2012–13	NPL Premier Division					—					
North Ferriby United	2013–14	Conference North	42	1	1	0	—		4	0	47	1
North Ferriby United	2014–15	Conference North	37	1	1	0	—		8	0	46	1
North Ferriby United	2015–16	National League North	42	0	2	0	—		0	0	44	0
North Ferriby United	2016–17	National League	0	0	0	0	—		0	0	0	0
North Ferriby United	2017–18	National League North	11	0	0	0	—		0	0	11	0
North Ferriby United	Total		307	34	15	2	—		48	10	370	46
Career total			325	35	16	2	0	0	53	10	394	47

== Honours ==
North Ferriby United

- FA Trophy: 2014–15
