= Anthony Lloyd =

English footballer (born 1984)

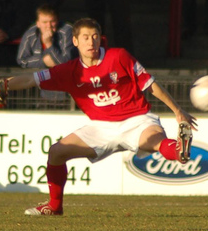
- Lloyd playing for York City in 2007

Personal information
- Full name: Anthony Francis Lloyd
- Date of birth: 14 March 1984 (age 42)
- Place of birth: Taunton, England
- Height: 5 ft 7 in (1.70 m)
- Position: Defender

Team information
- Current team: North Ferriby United

Youth career
- ?–2002: Huddersfield Town

Senior career*
Years	Team	Apps	(Gls)
2002–2006	Huddersfield Town	42	(3)
2005–2006	→ Torquay United (loan)	9	(0)
2006	Torquay United	11	(0)
2006–2007	York City	30	(0)
2007	Farsley Celtic	3	(0)
2007–2008	York City	15	(0)
2008–2011	Guiseley	?	(?)
2010–2011	→ Bradford Park Avenue (loan)	?	(?)
2011	Stocksbridge Park Steels	?	(?)
2011	North Ferriby United	2	(0)
- * Club domestic league appearances and goals as of 02:53, 18 December 2011 (UTC)

Anthony Francis Lloyd (born 14 March 1984) is an English former footballer who last played for North Ferriby United as a defender. He played over 60 games in the Football League for Huddersfield Town and Torquay United as well over 40 games for York City in the Conference Premier.

== Career ==
Born in Taunton, Somerset, Lloyd began his career as a trainee with the Huddersfield Town youth system, signing a professional contract on 22 August 2003. Lloyd made his league debut on 27 September 2003 after starting in a 3–0 win at home to Leyton Orient. He was a member of the 2004 promotion side, playing in the play-off Final at the Millennium Stadium, Cardiff as Huddersfield beat Mansfield Town in a penalty shoot-out after a 0–0 draw after extra time. He finished the 2003–04 season, his first in the first team, with 36 appearances and three goals.

Lloyd joined Torquay United on a one-month loan on 2 November 2005, and this was extended for a second month later in November. He signed for Torquay permanently on 5 January 2006 on a contract until the end of the 2005–06 season. He played against Birmingham City for Torquay.

He joined Conference National club York City on 20 July 2006, after turning down a new contract with Torquay. He played in both legs of York's 2–1 defeat on aggregate Morecambe in the play-off semi-finals. He finished the 2006–07 season after making 35 appearances for York and the club announced on 16 May 2007 that he would be released when his contract expired on 30 June.

Following his release by York, Lloyd went on trial with Farsley Celtic and signed for the newly promoted Conference Premier side on 31 July. He was employed by the club on a short-term, part-time basis and worked in a warehouse. He rejoined York on 27 September after leaving Farsley. He scored his first goal for York in the FA Trophy first round away to Altrincham, in a 3–1 victory. He was released by York for a second time following the end of the 2007–08 season.

Lloyd joined Guiseley in July 2008. He joined Bradford Park Avenue on loan on 29 December 2010. After being released by Guiseley he signed for Northern Premier League Premier Division side Stocksbridge Park Steels on 28 July 2011. He signed for Northern Premier League Premier Division rivals North Ferriby United in December.

== Career statistics ==
As of match played 13 December 2011.

Appearances and goals by club, season and competition
Club	Season	League^{[A]}		FA Cup		League Cup		Other^{[B]}		Total	
Club	Season	Apps	Goals	Apps	Goals	Apps	Goals	Apps	Goals	Apps	Goals
Huddersfield Town	2002–03	0	0	0	0	0	0	0	0	0	0
Huddersfield Town	2003–04	31	3	1	0	0	0	4	0	36	3
Huddersfield Town	2004–05	11	0	1	0	0	0	2	0	14	0
Huddersfield Town	2005–06	0	0	0	0	0	0	1	0	1	0
Huddersfield Town	Total	42	3	2	0	0	0	7	0	51	3
Torquay United (loan)	2005–06	9	0	3	0	0	0	0	0	12	0
Torquay United	2005–06	11	0	2	0	0	0	0	0	13	0
York City	2006–07	30	0	2	0	0	0	3	0	35	0
Farsley Celtic	2007–08	3	0	0	0	0	0	0	0	3	0
York City	2007–08	15	0	0	0	0	0	8	1	23	1
North Ferriby United	2011–12	2	0	0	0	0	0	1	0	3	0
Career totals		112	3	9	0	0	0	19	1	140	4

== Honours ==
Huddersfield Town

- Football League Third Division play-offs: 2004

== Footnotes ==
A. The "League" column constitutes appearances and goals (including those as a substitute) in the Football League and Football Conference.
B. The "Other" column constitutes appearances and goals (including those as a substitute) in the Conference League Cup, FA Trophy, Football League Trophy and play-offs.
