= Duncum =

Duncum is a surname. Notable people with the surname include:

- Bobby Duncum Jr. (1965–2000), American wrestler
- Bobby Duncum Sr. (1944–2026), American wrestler, father of Bobby Duncum Jr.
- Ken Duncum, New Zealand playwright and screenwriter
- Sam Duncum (born 1987), English footballer
