= Tom Evans (footballer, born 1976) =

English goalkeeper

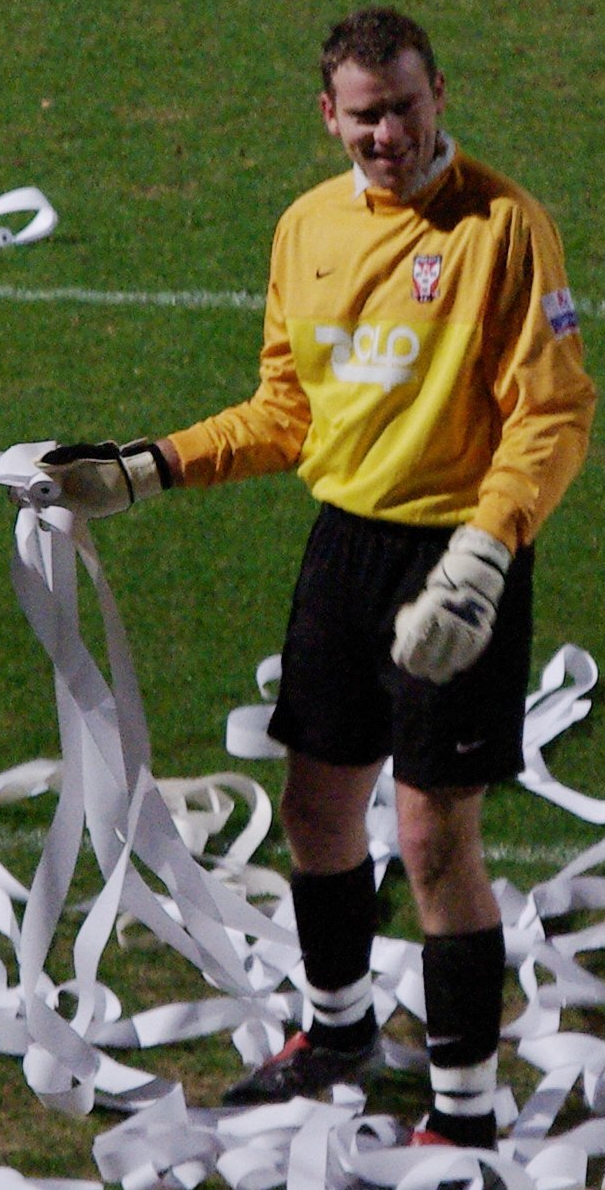
- Evans playing for York City in 2007

Personal information
- Full name: Thomas Raymond Evans
- Date of birth: 31 December 1976 (age 49)
- Place of birth: Doncaster, England
- Height: 6 ft 0 in (1.83 m)
- Position: Goalkeeper

Youth career
- –1995: Sheffield United

Senior career*
Years	Team	Apps	(Gls)
1995–1996	Sheffield United	0	(0)
1996–1997	Crystal Palace	0	(0)
1996	→ Harrow Borough (loan)		
1997	→ Coventry City (loan)	0	(0)
1997–2006	Scunthorpe United	245	(0)
2006–2008	York City	81	(0)
2008–2009	Alfreton Town	16	(0)
2009	→ Gainsborough Trinity (loan)	4	(0)
2009–2010	Boston United		
Total		346	(0)

International career
2003	Northern Ireland B	1	(0)
- * Club domestic league appearances and goals

Thomas Raymond Evans (born 31 December 1976) is a former professional footballer who played as a goalkeeper. Born in England, he played for the Northern Ireland B team.

== Club career ==
=== Early career ===
Born in Doncaster, South Yorkshire, Evans started his career with the Sheffield United youth system as a trainee before signing a professional contract on 3 July 1995. He made no appearances for the side before joining Crystal Palace on a free transfer on 14 June 1996, and was loaned out to Isthmian League side Harrow Borough in August. Evans later made a loan move to Premier League side Coventry City in March 1997, but failed to make any appearances.

=== Scunthorpe United ===
Palace released him after his first season at the club and on 22 August 1997 he signed for Scunthorpe United. Evans played for Scunthorpe in their 1–0 victory over Leyton Orient in the 1999 Third Division play-off final at Wembley Stadium. He had surgery on a hand injury in May 2005, having suffered a problem with one of his knuckles on his index finger that had troubled him in previous seasons. This operation led to him missing the first two months of the season, but returned to the line-up in early December. He kept his place in the team for three months and after another spell on the sidelines he played in Scunthorpe's last six matches of the season.

=== York City ===
He was released by Scunthorpe in May 2006 and joined Conference National club York City on 31 July after making a good impression on manager Billy McEwan during several weeks on trial. He said that he believed promotion could be achieved for York with 20 clean sheets. He was sent off in the 16th minute of an away match against Crawley Town on 9 September 2006 after fouling Dannie Bulman outside the penalty area, which York lost 3–0 with second choice goalkeeper Arran Reid brought on to replace him. He was offered a new contract by York at the end of 2006–07.

At the beginning of York's 2007–08 season, Evans came under-fire for poor performances by his manager, Billy McEwan and was later replaced by on-loan Bristol City goalkeeper Stephen Henderson. Evans kept his place in the side after Henderson's recall back to Bristol City but was released at the end of the season.

=== Later career ===
He signed for Alfreton Town in the Conference North in July 2008. Evans found himself dropped from the Alfreton team at the beginning of December 2008 and in March 2009 Evans joined Gainsborough Trinity on a one-month loan, debuting in 1–1 away draw with Redditch United on 21 March 2009. At Gainsborough, he made four appearances. He finished 2008–09 with 24 appearances with Alfreton and he was released by the club, after which he joined Northern Premier League Premier Division team Boston United on 23 July 2009. He was released by Boston on 9 May 2010 after helping them win promotion to the Conference North after beating Bradford Park Avenue 2–1 in the 2010 Northern Premier League Premier Division play-off final. He later returned to former club Scunthorpe to coach the youth team's goalkeepers.

== International career ==
Evans played Northern Ireland at youth level and won his only cap for the Northern Ireland B team in a 2–1 defeat to Scotland on 20 May 2003.

== Personal life ==
After retiring from professional football, Evans earned qualifications as a financial adviser and worked for Lloyds Bank before joining Paul Kerr Associates, the organisation of former player Paul Kerr. He has a son called Bobby and a daughter called Molly

== Career statistics ==
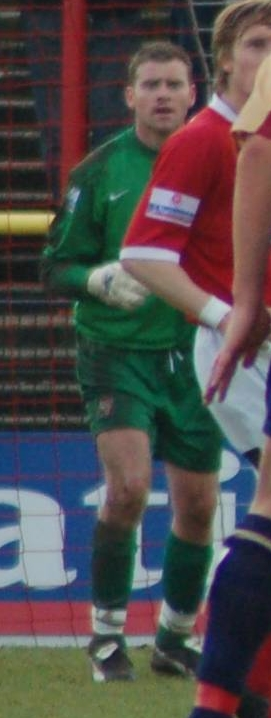
Evans playing for York City in 2007

Appearances and goals by club, season and competition
Club	Season	League			FA Cup		League Cup		Other		Total	
Club	Season	Division	Apps	Goals	Apps	Goals	Apps	Goals	Apps	Goals	Apps	Goals
Scunthorpe United	1997–98	Third Division	5	0	1	0	1	0	0	0	7	0
Scunthorpe United	1998–99	Third Division	24	0	1	0	0	0	2 (Note: One appearance in Football League Trophy, one in Third Division play-offs)	0	27	0
Scunthorpe United	1999–2000	Second Division	28	0	1	0	2	0	0	0	31	0
Scunthorpe United	2000–01	Third Division	46	0	5	0	2	0	1 (Note: Appearance(s) in Football League Trophy)	0	54	0
Scunthorpe United	2001–02	Third Division	42	0	3	0	0	0	3	0	48	0
Scunthorpe United	2002–03	Third Division	46	0	4	0	1	0	3 (Note: One appearance in Football League Trophy, two in Third Division play-offs)	0	54	0
Scunthorpe United	2003–04	Third Division	36	0	6	0	1	0	3	0	46	0
Scunthorpe United	2004–05	League Two	0	0	0	0	0	0	1	0	1	0
Scunthorpe United	2005–06	League One	18	0	2	0	0	0	3	0	23	0
Scunthorpe United	Total		245	0	23	0	7	0	16	0	291	0
York City	2006–07	Conference National	45	0	2	0	—		3 (Note: One appearance in FA Trophy, two in Conference National play-offs)	0	50	0
York City	2007–08	Conference Premier	36	0	2	0	—		9 (Note: Seven appearances in FA Trophy, two in Conference League Cup)	0	47	0
York City	Total		81	0	4	0	—		12	0	97	0
Alfreton Town	2008–09	Conference North	16	0	6	0	—		2 (Note: One appearance in Conference League Cup, one in FA Trophy)	0	24	0
Gainsborough Trinity (loan)	2008–09	Conference North	4	0	—		—		—		4	0
Career total			346	0	33	0	7	0	30	0	416	0

== Honours ==
Scunthorpe United

- Football League Third Division play-offs: 1999

Boston United

- Northern Premier League Premier Division play-offs: 2010
