= 2002–03 Birmingham City F.C. season =

Birmingham City F.C.
2002–03 season
- Chairman: David Gold
- Manager: Steve Bruce
- Stadium: St Andrew's
- Premier League: 13th
- FA Cup: Third round
- League Cup: Third round
- Top goalscorer: League: Clinton Morrison (6); All: Stern John (9)
- Highest home attendance: 29,505 (five matches)
- Lowest home attendance: 12,241 vs Preston North End, League Cup 3rd round, 5 November 2002
- Average home league attendance: 28,831

The 2002–03 season was Birmingham City Football Club's 100th in the English football league system, their 51st in the top tier, and their debut season in the Premier League, having been promoted via the play-offs. Under the management of Steve Bruce, they finished in 13th position in the 20-team league. Birmingham entered the 2002–03 FA Cup at the third round and lost to Fulham in that round, and, having entered the League Cup in the second round, lost to Preston North End in the third.

French manufacturers Le Coq Sportif supplied Birmingham's kit for the fifth consecutive season, and mobile phone retailer Phones4U retained the shirt sponsorship. Stern John was top scorer with nine goals in all competitions; if only league goals are considered, Clinton Morrison top-scored with six. Steve Vickers was club captain, but his long absences through injury meant that vice-captain Jeff Kenna usually captained the team.

== Pre-season ==
=== Pre-season friendlies ===
Date	Opponents	Venue	Result	Score F–A	Scorers	Attendance	Report
17 July 2002	Exeter City	A	W	1–0	Johnson 63'	2,600	
20 July 2002	Forest Green Rovers	A	W	6–0	John 10', Hughes (2) 15' 80', Lazaridis (2) 22' 40', Savage 45'		
22 July 2002	Livingston	A	L	1–2	Andrews (o.g.)	2,000	
24 July 2002	Motherwell	A	L	1–2	Devlin		
27 July 2002	Partick Thistle	A	W	2–1	John 26' (pen), Horsfield		
31 July 2002	Tranmere Rovers	A	W	7–0	John (2) 8' 50', Hughes (2), Grainger 11', Devlin, Carter		
3 August 2002	Stoke City	A	W	2–0	Mooney 16', Lazaridis 60'		
10 August 2002	Deportivo Alavés	H	D	1–1	Hughes 80'	9,000	

== Premier League ==
=== Season review ===
Birmingham's first season in the Premiership was a rollercoaster of a ride that resulted in the team finishing in 13th, although they were favourites to be relegated at the start of the season.

Once Birmingham had secured their states in the Premiership after beating Norwich City in the First Division playoff final the year before, manager Steve Bruce started to strengthen the squad. Internationals Robbie Savage of Wales, Kenny Cunningham and Clinton Morrison of Ireland, and Aliou Cissé of Senegal all joined the side.

Stern John's penalty in the 1–1 draw with Everton on 28 August 2002 was Birmingham's first goal in the Premiership, and first in the top flight since Robert Hopkins scored against Newcastle United back in the 1985–86 season. The next match secured Birmingham their first three points in the league, as they beat Leeds United 2–1 thanks to goals from Paul Devlin and Damien Johnson.

A highlight of the season was the 3–0 victory over local rivals Aston Villa. A first-half goal from Clinton Morrison saw Birmingham in control at half time, before a comedy of errors saw a throw-in by Olof Mellberg roll under the foot of Villa goalkeeper Peter Enckelman and into the net to gift the side a 2–0 lead. Geoff Horsfield added a third later in the game thanks to bad defending from defender Alpay.

By the New Year, Birmingham were in 15th position in the table, seven points clear of 18th-placed Sunderland. This did not stop Bruce spending in the winter transfer window, as Stephen Clemence, Jamie Clapham and Matthew Upson all joined the club. These transfers fall into insignificance compared to the impact that French World Cup-winning forward Christophe Dugarry would make.

A bad start to 2003 saw Birmingham fall to 16th in the table, only five points separating themselves and 18th-placed West Bromwich Albion. This was before Liverpool's visit to St Andrew's, when Birmingham took a two-goal lead through Clemence and Morrison before Michael Owen added a late consolation goal. This game was followed by the visit to Aston Villa. The game kicked into life when Villa striker Dion Dublin was sent off in the 51st minute for headbutting Savage. In the 74th minute, Australian Stan Lazaridis scored his first goal of the season, and three minutes later, a poor header back by Jlloyd Samuel allowed Horsfield to run onto the ball, beat Enckelman and score from close range. The game ended with another sending off, as Villa's Joey Guðjónsson lunged at Upson with a two-footed tackle.

Birmingham were not yet assured of safety by the time they played Sunderland on 12 April, but Bryan Hughes and Christophe Dugarry scored to give Birmingham a 2–0 win. Dugarry went on to score four goals in Birmingham's next three games, including a stunning effort against Middlesbrough where he beat the offside trap before calmly taking the ball out of the air with his knee and volleying it into the net.

The last game of the season saw the side entertain West Ham United, who were in real danger of relegation. Birmingham managed a 2–2 draw thanks to goals from Horsfield and John, but it was enough to send the Hammers down.

=== Match details ===
Date	League position	Opponents	Venue	Result	Score F–A	Scorers	Attendance	Report
18 August 2002	18th	Arsenal	A	L	0–2		38,018	
24 August 2002	19th	Blackburn Rovers	H	L	0–1		27,563	
28 August 2002	17th	Everton	A	D	1–1	John 50' pen.	37,197	
31 August 2002	14th	Leeds United	H	W	2–1	Devlin 32', D. Johnson 58'	27,164	
11 September 2002	15th	Liverpool	A	D	2–2	Morrison (2) 61', 90'	43,113	
16 September 2002	9th	Aston Villa	H	W	3–0	Morrison 31', Enckelman 77' o.g., Horsfield 83'	29,505	
21 September 2002	10th	Middlesbrough	A	L	0–1		29,869	
28 September 2002	14th	Newcastle United	H	L	0–2		29,072	
5 October 2002	12th	West Ham United	A	W	2–1	John (2) 4', 43'	35,010	
19 October 2002	12th	West Bromwich Albion	A	D	1–1	Moore 86' o.g.	27,021	
26 October 2002	13th	Manchester City	H	L	0–2		28,316	
2 November 2002	12th	Bolton Wanderers	H	W	3–1	Purse 61', Savage 72', Horsfield 83'	27,224	
9 November 2002	14th	Chelsea	A	L	0–3		35,237	
17 November 2002	15th	Fulham	H	D	0–0		26,164	
23 November 2002	13th	Sunderland	A	W	1–0	Morrison 89'	38,803	
30 November 2002	11th	Tottenham Hotspur	H	D	1–1	Kenna 68'	29,505	
7 December 2002	13th	Southampton	A	L	0–2		31,132	
15 December 2002	13th	Fulham	A	W	1–0	Kirovski 7'	14,962	
21 December 2002	13th	Charlton Athletic	H	D	1–1	Devlin 67' pen.	29,505	
26 December 2002	13th	Everton	H	D	1–1	Kirovski 45'	29,505	
28 December 2002	15th	Manchester United	A	L	0–2		67,640	
1 January 2003	15th	Leeds United	A	L	0–2		40,034	
12 January 2003	15th	Arsenal	H	L	0–4		29,505	
18 January 2003	15th	Blackburn Rovers	A	D	1–1	John 83'	23,331	
1 February 2003	16th	Bolton Wanderers	A	L	2–4	Savage 44', Morrison 60'	24,288	
4 February 2003	16th	Manchester United	H	L	0–1		29,475	
8 February 2003	16th	Chelsea	H	L	1–3	Savage 87' pen.	29,475	
23 February 2003	16th	Liverpool	H	W	2–1	Clemence 34', Morrison 68'	29,449	
3 March 2003	16th	Aston Villa	A	W	2–0	Lazaridis 74', Horsfield 77'	42,602	
16 March 2003	16th	Manchester City	A	L	0–1		34,596	
22 March 2003	16th	West Bromwich Albion	H	W	1–0	Horsfield 90'	29,449	
5 April 2003	17th	Tottenham Hotspur	A	L	1–2	Devlin 77' pen.	36,058	
12 April 2003	16th	Sunderland	H	W	2–0	Hughes 43', Dugarry 60'	29,132	
19 April 2003	15th	Charlton Athletic	A	W	2–0	Dugarry 20', Savage 55' pen.	25,732	
21 April 2003	13th	Southampton	H	W	3–2	Dugarry 75', 82', Hughes 79'	29,115	
26 April 2003	12th	Middlesbrough	H	W	3–0	Dugarry 18', Clemence 40', Lazaridis 80'	28,821	
3 May 2003	13th	Newcastle United	A	L	0–1		52,146	
11 May 2003	13th	West Ham United	H	D	2–2	Horsfield 80', John 88'	29,505	

=== Final league table ===
Pos	Team	Pld	W	D	L	GF	GA	GD	Pts
11	Middlesbrough	38	13	10	15	48	44	+4	49
12	Charlton Athletic	38	14	7	17	45	56	−11	49
13	Birmingham City	38	13	9	16	41	49	−8	48
14	Fulham	38	13	9	16	41	50	−9	48
15	Leeds United	38	14	5	19	58	57	+1	47

Source: Premier League
Rules for classification: 1) points; 2) goal difference; 3) number of goals scored.

=== Results summary ===
Overall								Home						Away					
Pld	W	D	L	GF	GA	GD	Pts	W	D	L	GF	GA	GD	W	D	L	GF	GA	GD
38	13	9	16	41	49	−8	48	8	5	6	25	23	+2	5	4	10	16	26	−10

== FA Cup ==
Birmingham failed to get past the third round of the FA Cup, losing to Premiership side Fulham.

Round	Date	Opponents	Venue	Result	Score F–A	Scorers	Attendance	Report
Third round	5 January 2003	Fulham	A	L	1–3	John 90'	9,203	

== League Cup ==
Birmingham reached the third round of the League Cup before losing to Preston North End of the First Division.

Round	Date	Opponents	Venue	Result	Score F–A	Scorers	Attendance	Report
Second round	2 October 2002	Leyton Orient	A	W	3–2	John 16', 27', 77'	3,615	
Third round	5 November 2002	Preston North End	H	L	0–2		12,241	

== Transfers ==
=== In ===
Date	Player	Club†	Fee	Ref
30 May 2002	Robbie Savage	Leicester City	£2.5m–£3m	
9 July 2002	Aliou Cissé	Montpellier	£4.5m	
16 July 2002	Kenny Cunningham	Wimbledon	Undisclosed	
30 July 2002	Clinton Morrison	Crystal Palace	Undisclosed (Note: The total fee for Morrison to join Birmingham was announced as a club record. The deal included Andrew Johnson moving to Crystal Palace as a makeweight; the fee for Morrison was reported as £4.25m and that for Johnson as £750,000.)	
15 August 2002	Jovan Kirovski	(Crystal Palace)	Free	
13 September 2002	Darryl Powell	(Derby County)	Free	
10 January 2003	Jamie Clapham	Ipswich Town	£1.3m	
10 January 2003	Stephen Clemence	Tottenham Hotspur	£900,000	
22 January 2003	Matthew Upson	Arsenal	£1.1m	
13 March 2003	Andy Marriott	Barnsley	Nominal	

† Brackets round club names indicate the player's contract with that club had expired before he joined Birmingham.

=== Out ===
Date	Player	Fee	Joined†	Ref
30 July 2002	Andrew Johnson	Crystal Palace	Undisclosed	
5 September 2002	Paul Furlong	Queens Park Rangers	Free	
21 October 2002	Nicky Eaden	Wigan Athletic	Nominal	
11 November 2002	Jerry Gill	Northampton Town	Free	
22 November 2002	Graham Hyde	(Bristol Rovers)	Released	
15 January 2003	Darryl Powell	(Sheffield Wednesday)	Released	
8 May 2003	Tony Capaldi	Plymouth Argyle	Free	
22 May 2003	Tommy Mooney	(Swindon Town)	Released	
30 June 2003	Clint Davies		Released	
30 June 2003	Andy Marriott		Released	
30 June 2003	Steve Vickers		Released	

† Brackets round a club denote the player joined that club after his Birmingham City contract expired.

=== Loan in ===
Date	Player	Club	Return	Ref
1 January 2003	Ferdinand Coly	RC Lens	End of season	
2 January 2003	Christophe Dugarry	Bordeaux	End of season	
21 January 2003	Piotr Świerczewski	Marseille	End of season	

=== Loan out ===
Date	Player	Club	Return	Ref
8 August 2002	Paul Furlong	Queens Park Rangers	One month	
8 August 2002	Jerry Gill	Northampton Town	Two months	
8 August 2002	Tom Williams	Queens Park Rangers	End of season	
13 September 2002	Tommy Mooney	Stoke City	Three months	
20 September 2002	Nicky Eaden	Wigan Athletic	One month	
20 September 2002	Graham Hyde	Peterborough United	Two months	
15 January 2003	Craig Fagan	Bristol City	One month	
17 January 2003	Tommy Mooney	Sheffield United	3 March 2003	
27 January 2003	Curtis Woodhouse	Rotherham United	End of season	
19 March 2003	Tommy Mooney	Derby County	End of season	

== Appearances and goals ==
Numbers in parentheses denote appearances made as a substitute.
Players marked † left the club during the playing season.
Players with names in italics and marked * were on loan from another club for the whole of their season with Birmingham.
Players listed with no appearances have been in the matchday squad but only as unused substitutes.
Key to positions: GK – Goalkeeper; DF – Defender; MF – Midfielder; FW – Forward

Players' appearances and goals by competition
No.	Pos.	Nat.	Name	League		FA Cup		League Cup		Total		Discipline	
No.	Pos.	Nat.	Name	Apps	Goals	Apps	Goals	Apps	Goals	Apps	Goals	A yellow rectangle, denoting the yellow penalty card shown to a player being cautioned	A red rectangle, denoting the red penalty card shown to a player being sent off
1	GK	ENG	Ian Bennett	10	0	0	0	2	0	12	0	0	0
2	DF	IRE	Jeff Kenna	36 (1)	1	1	0	1	0	38 (1)	1	1	0
3	DF	ENG	Martin Grainger	8 (1)	0	1	0	0	0	9 (1)	0	3	0
4	DF	ENG	Steve Vickers	5	0	0	0	1	0	6	0	0	0
5	DF	ENG	Darren Purse	19 (1)	1	0	0	1	0	20 (1)	1	7	1
6	MF	SEN	Aliou Cissé	21	0	0	0	0	0	21	0	11	0
7	MF	SCO	Paul Devlin	20 (12)	3	1	0	0	0	12 (12)	3	4	0
8	MF	WAL	Robbie Savage	33	4	1	0	0	0	34	4	10	0
9	FW	ENG	Geoff Horsfield	15 (16)	5	0	0	2	0	17 (16)	5	1	2
10	MF	ENG	Bryan Hughes	10 (12)	2	0 (1)	0	1	0	11 (13)	2	3	0
11	MF	AUS	Stan Lazaridis	17 (13)	2	0	0	2	0	19 (13)	2	1	0
12	DF	IRE	Kenny Cunningham	31	0	0	0	1	0	32	0	1	0
14	FW	TRI	Stern John	20 (10)	5	0 (1)	1	1	3	21 (11)	9	2	0
15	FW	USA	Jovan Kirovski	5 (12)	2	1	0	1 (1)	0	7 (13)	2	1	0
16	FW	ENG	Tommy Mooney	0 (1)	0	0	0	0	0	0 (1)	0	1	0
17	FW	JAM	Michael Johnson	5 (1)	0	0	0	0	0	5 (1)	0	0	0
18	GK	BEL	Nico Vaesen	27	0	1	0	0	0	28	0	0	0
19	FW	IRE	Clinton Morrison	24 (4)	6	1	0	1	0	26 (4)	6	6	0
~~21~~†	DF	ENG	Nicky Eaden	0	0	0	0	0	0	0	0	0	0
21	FW	FRA	Christophe Dugarry *	16	5	0	0	0	0	16	5	4	0
22	MF	NIR	Damien Johnson	28 (2)	1	1	0	0 (1)	0	29 (3)	1	6	0
23	DF	ENG	Jamie Clapham	16	0	0	0	0	0	16	0	1	0
24	MF	ENG	Darren Carter	3 (9)	0	0	0	1	0	4 (9)	0	0	0
25	MF	JAM	Darryl Powell †	3 (8)	0	1	0	2	0	6 (8)	0	3	0
25	DF	ENG	Matthew Upson	14	0	0	0	0	0	14	0	1	1
26	DF	CIV	Olivier Tébily	12	0	0	0	1	0	13	0	5	1
27	DF	ENG	Joey Hutchinson	1	0	1	0	1	0	3	0	0	0
28	MF	ENG	Curtis Woodhouse	0 (3)	0	0	0	1	0	1 (3)	0	0	0
29	FW	ENG	Craig Fagan	0 (1)	0	0 (1)	0	0 (2)	0	0 (4)	0	0	0
30	DF	ENG	Mat Sadler	2	0	0	0	2	0	4	0	1	0
32	MF	ENG	Stephen Clemence	15	2	0	0	0	0	15	2	3	0
33	DF	SEN	Ferdinand Coly *	1	0	1	0	0	0	2	0	1	0
34	MF	POL	Piotr Świerczewski *	0 (1)	0	0	0	0	0	0 (1)	0	1	0
35	GK	AUS	Clint Davies	0	0	0	0	0	0	0	0	0	0
36	GK	WAL	Andy Marriott	1	0	0	0	0	0	1	0	1	0

Players not included in matchday squads
No.	Pos.	Nat.	Name
13	MF	ENG	Graham Hyde †
13	DF	NIR	Tony Capaldi †
20	MF	ENG	Tom Williams
23	DF	ENG	Jerry Gill †
25	FW	ENG	Paul Furlong †
31	MF	FRA	Christophe Grondin
