= Daniel Parslow =

Welsh association football player

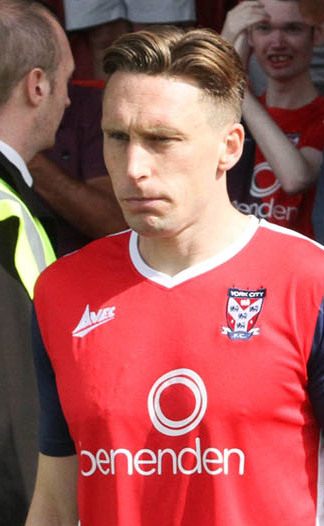
- Parslow with York City in 2017

Personal information
- Full name: Daniel James Parslow
- Date of birth: 11 September 1985 (age 41)
- Place of birth: Hengoed, Wales
- Height: 6 ft 1 in (1.85 m)
- Position: Centre-back

Youth career
- 1998–2005: Cardiff City

Senior career*
Years	Team	Apps	(Gls)
2005–2006	Cardiff City	0	(0)
2006–2015	York City	260	(3)
2014	→ Grimsby Town (loan)	7	(0)
2014–2015	→ Grimsby Town (loan)	19	(0)
2015–2017	Cheltenham Town	67	(2)
2017	→ York City (loan)	18	(0)
2017–2019	York City	40	(2)
Total		411	(7)

International career
2002	Wales U17	1	(0)
2003	Wales U19	3	(0)
2004	Wales U21	4	(0)
2007–2008	Wales semi-pro	8	(0)
- * Club domestic league appearances and goals

Daniel James Parslow (born 11 September 1985) is a Welsh former professional footballer who played as a centre-back in the English Football League for York City and Cheltenham Town.

Parslow started his career with Cardiff City in their youth system, before signing a professional contract in 2005. He signed for Conference National club York City a year later after being released by Cardiff. He did not establish himself in the team in the 2006–07 season, but played in their play-off semi-final defeat by Morecambe. He became a regular starter during 2007–08 under the management of Colin Walker, and during 2008–09 assumed the captaincy from Mark Greaves. In this season, he was named Clubman of the Year and led the team to the 2009 FA Trophy Final, in which York were beaten 2–0 by Stevenage Borough. Parslow was replaced as captain by Michael Ingham during 2009–10, and was an unused substitute in York's 3–1 defeat by Oxford United in the 2010 Conference Premier play-off final. He won his second Clubman of the Year award in 2010–11, having appeared in all of York's matches that season.

Parslow was a member of the York team that won the 2012 FA Trophy Final and 2012 Conference Premier play-off final in 2011–12, with victory in the latter seeing the club promoted into League Two after eight years out of the Football League. He missed only one match in 2012–13, in which he won the Clubman of the Year award for an unprecedented third time. Parslow was out injured for most of 2013–14, and was on loan with Conference Premier club Grimsby Town during 2014–15, playing in their penalty shoot-out defeat in the 2015 Conference Premier play-off final. He signed for Cheltenham Town of the National League in 2015, and was part of the team that earned promotion into League Two by winning the divisional title in 2015–16. He returned to York, initially on loan, in 2017 and helped them win in the 2017 FA Trophy Final. Parslow retired from playing in 2019 because of a head injury.

== Club career ==
=== Cardiff City ===
Parslow started his career with Cardiff City's youth system in 1998. Having progressed through the club's centre of excellence he earned a three-year scholarship in May 2002, which turned into a one-year professional contract on its conclusion. He made an appearance for Cardiff in a 1–0 defeat by Bangor City in the FAW Premier Cup on 25 January 2005 and was included in the first-team squad for the 2005–06 season. Parslow went on trial with League One club Swansea City in March 2006, before returning to Cardiff the following month after nothing materialised. After making no appearances he was released by Cardiff on 22 May 2006.

=== York City ===
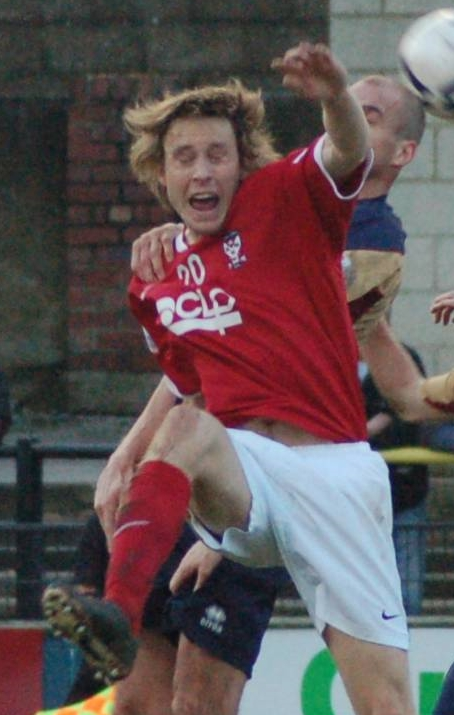
Parslow playing for York City in 2007

Parslow was signed by Conference National club York City on 18 August 2006 following a successful trial. He made his debut as a 67th-minute substitute for James Dudgeon in York's 3–0 away defeat by Crawley Town on 9 September 2006. At different points during 2006–07 Parslow lost his place in the team to David McGurk, Jason Goodliffe and János Kovács, but started York's last seven fixtures, including both legs of the 2–1 aggregate defeat by Morecambe in the play-off semi-final. Having finished 2006–07 with 26 appearances for York, the club exercised their option to extend his contract for 2007–08 in May 2007.

Parslow missed the start of 2007–08 with an ankle injury, making his first appearance in York's third match, a 1–1 draw away to Exeter City on 20 August 2007. He went nearly three months without starting a match when being named in the starting XI as part of a three-man central defence for York's 2–1 win away to Weymouth on 24 November 2007 in Colin Walker's first match as caretaker manager. He established himself in the team under Walker, starting all of York's remaining matches in 2007–08. Parslow scored his first career goal with the only goal in a 1–0 away win over Rushden & Diamonds in the fourth round of the FA Trophy on 23 February 2008, which came from a diving header eight yards out in the 16th minute. He made 40 appearances and scored two goals in 2007–08, before York exercised their option for Parslow's contract to be extended for 2008–09 in April 2008.

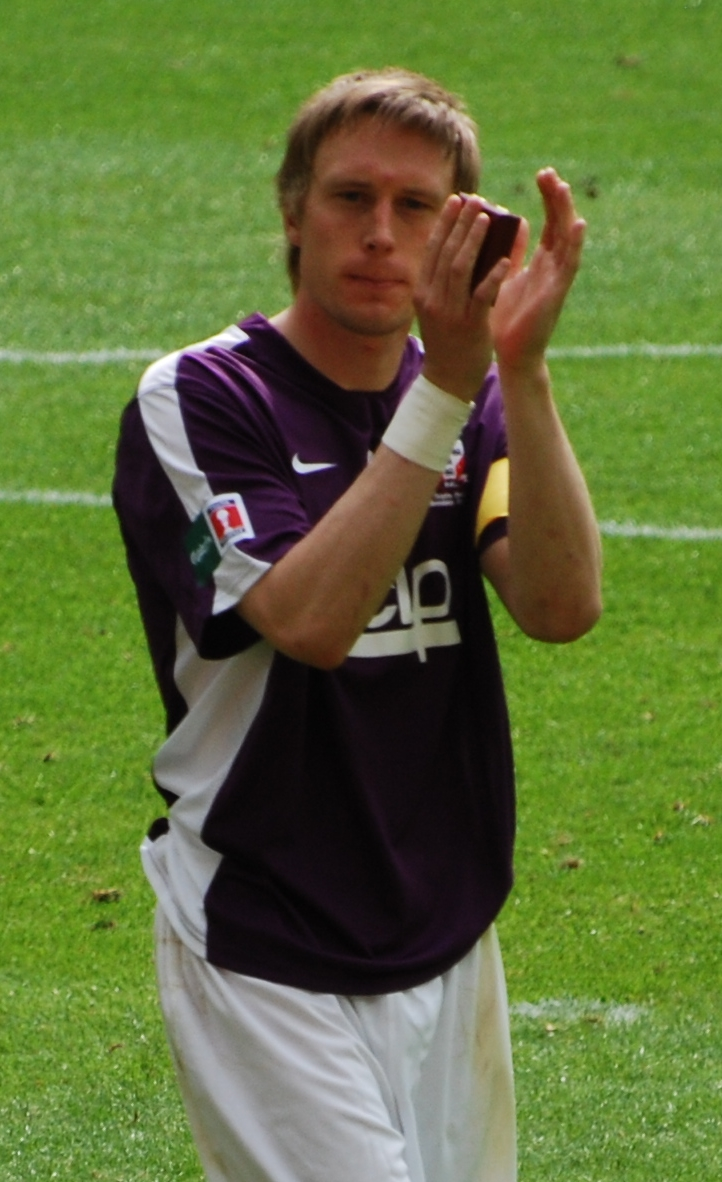
Parslow after playing for York City in the 2009 FA Trophy Final

He signed a new contract with York in September 2008 that contracted him to the club until June 2010. He took over the captaincy when club captain Mark Greaves and vice-captain McGurk were out of the team, starting on 27 January 2009 for a 1–1 draw away to Altrincham. Having "led by example" after attaining the captaincy, he was voted by supporters as York's Clubman of the Year for 2008–09, being presented the award before their penultimate home match against Eastbourne Borough on 18 April 2009. He started in the 2009 FA Trophy Final at Wembley Stadium on 9 May 2009, which York lost 2–0 to Stevenage Borough. Ahead of the Trophy final, he was rested for the final league match away to Lewes on 26 April 2009; this was the only match he missed in 2008–09, which he finished with 57 appearances.

Parslow and McGurk were appointed as club captains for 2009–10, although Parslow would continue to wear the armband in matches. He signed a new contract with York in January 2010 to tie him to the club until June 2012. He played in the team as a centre-back and right-back before losing his place to Ben Purkiss after picking up a foot injury in York's 2–1 away defeat to Forest Green Rovers on 6 March 2010, with the captain's armband being handed to Michael Ingham. He made his return in York's 1–0 away defeat by Stevenage in the last league match of 2009–10 on 24 April 2010, but was dropped to the bench for the play-off semi-final 1–0 victory at home to Luton Town. Parslow appeared as a 90-minute substitute in the second leg 1–0 away win, with the tie ending 2–0 on aggregate. However, he was an unused substitute for the 3–1 defeat by Oxford United at Wembley Stadium in the 2010 Conference Premier play-off final. He made 41 appearances for York in 2009–10.

Parslow had been playing mostly at right-back in 2010–11 before losing his place to Liam Darville in January 2011, but retained his place in the team by playing at centre-back in York's 4–0 victory over league leaders AFC Wimbledon on 1 February 2011 with McGurk suspended. Parslow scored his only goal of 2010–11 in this match after scoring the opening goal with a header from a free kick taken by Ashley Chambers. Having played at right-back the following match, he returned to playing at centre-back after McGurk's injury in York's 0–0 draw away to Altrincham on 22 February 2011. Parslow formed a central defensive partnership with Chris Smith, and manager Gary Mills praised him by calling him "outstanding". He had played in all of York's matches in 2010–11 before suffering a head injury following a clash of heads with Matthew Barnes-Homer in a 1–0 home win against Luton on 19 April 2011, which led to him missing the remainder of the campaign. Following the end of 2010–11, during which he made 47 appearances and scored one goal, he was named York's Clubman of the Year for a second time.

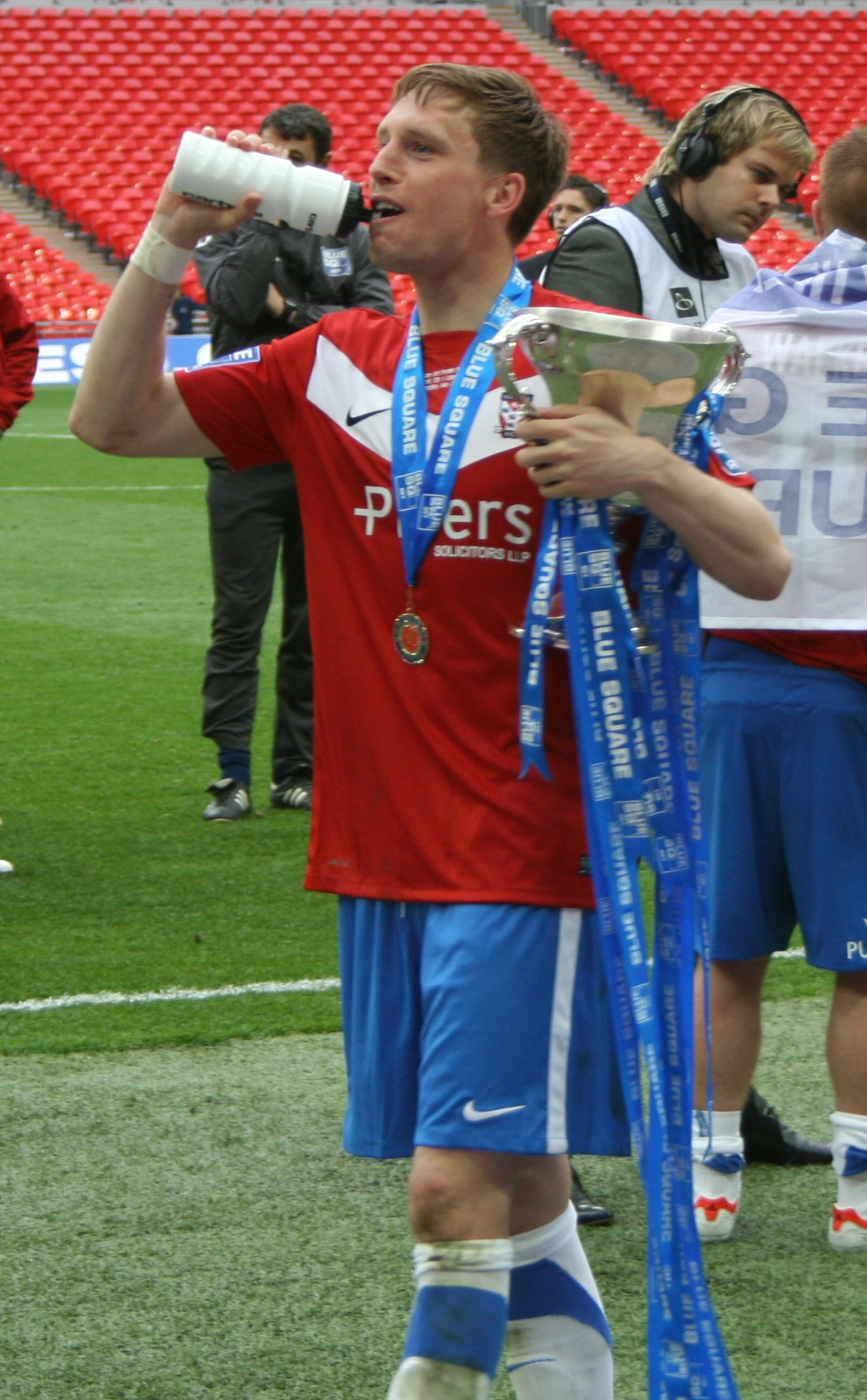
Parslow after playing for York City in the 2012 Conference Premier play-off final

Parslow started 2011–12 out of the team, with McGurk and Smith preferred in central defence. He appeared twice at right-back in the first two months of the season when Lanre Oyebanjo was absent, before falling behind Jon Challinor and Jamal Fyfield for a place in defence. Parslow was used mostly as a substitute from then before a run starting in central defence in late December 2011, before losing his place after the signing of Chris Doig in February 2012. He was restored to the starting line-up in early March 2012 due to other defenders being unavailable, before Doig once again took his place in the team. He returned to the starting line-up in early April 2012 due to Smith's absence and started 10 of York's last 11 fixtures of the season. Parslow won the 2012 FA Trophy Final with York at Wembley Stadium on 12 May 2012, in which they beat Newport County 2–0. Eight days later, he played in the 2–1 victory over Luton in the 2012 Conference Premier play-off final at Wembley Stadium, seeing the club return into the Football League after an eight-year absence with promotion into League Two. He completed 2011–12 with 38 appearances for York, after which he signed a new one-year contract with an option to extend in June 2012.

Parslow started York's first competitive fixture since promotion away to League One team Doncaster Rovers in the first round of the League Cup in the opening match of 2012–13 on 11 August 2012, which the team lost 4–2 in a penalty shoot-out following a 1–1 draw after extra time. He then played in York's first League Two fixture, a 3–1 home defeat by Wycombe Wanderers on 18 August 2012. His only goal of 2012–13 was the opener in York's first victory of the season, a 3–1 away win against Barnet on 25 August 2012, with a 20-yard volley into the bottom left corner. Parslow played at right-back, left-back and defensive midfield throughout the season, and played in the latter position in the end of season run-in to form part of a midfield trio also including Tom Platt and Adam Reed that helped York avoid relegation. He became the first York player to be named Clubman of the Year on three occasions, having been presented the award before York's final home match of the season against Southend United on 20 April 2013. Parslow missed only one match for York in 2012–13, making 50 appearances and scoring one goal, and signed a new two-year contract with the club in May 2013.

Parslow started 2013–14 in and out of the team, but when returning to the starting line-up for a 2–1 home defeat to Mansfield Town on 14 September 2013 was handed the captain's armband in the absence of Smith. He established himself in the centre of defence alongside McGurk, and retained the armband when Smith was recalled into the team. However, he sustained knee ligament damage when colliding into advertising hoardings as he sliced an attempted clearance during York's 2–1 defeat away to Southend on 23 November 2013. The injury ruled him out for the rest of the season, in which he had made 16 appearances. In his absence, York reached the play-offs with a seventh-place finish in League Two, although they were beaten 1–0 on aggregate by Fleetwood Town in the semi-final.

Parslow returned to fitness ahead of 2014–15, but having failed to regain his place in the team signed for Conference Premier club Grimsby Town on a one-month loan on 18 September 2014. He debuted two days later in their 1–0 away win over Kidderminster, and made seven appearances for Grimsby before the loan expired on 20 October 2014. Having been an unused substitute for three matches after returning to York, Parslow rejoined Grimsby on loan until 4 January 2015 on 7 November 2014, and made his second debut for the club a day later in a 3–1 home defeat to Oxford in the FA Cup first round. The loan was extended until the end of the season during January 2015. He came on as a 74th-minute substitute for Gregor Robertson in the 2015 Conference Premier play-off final against Bristol Rovers at Wembley on 17 May 2015; following a 1–1 draw after extra time, Grimsby lost 5–3 in a penalty shoot-out. Parslow had made 23 appearances in his second loan spell at Grimsby, and after returning to York was released after nine years at the club.

=== Cheltenham Town ===
After a successful trial, Parslow signed for newly relegated National League club Cheltenham Town on a one-year contract on 29 July 2015. He made his debut when starting a 1–1 away draw with Lincoln City on 8 August 2015, Cheltenham's first match of 2015–16, and established himself at centre-back, forming a partnership with Aaron Downes. Parslow scored his first goal for Cheltenham on 31 August 2015, with a volley in the 59th minute of a 2–1 home victory over Wrexham. He stood in as Cheltenham's vice-captain after a season-ending injury to the captain Downes in January 2016. after which he was partnered at centre-back with a number of players, including Cameron Burgess and Asa Hall. According to Oli Fell of the Gloucestershire Echo, it was after Downes' injury that Parslow "really came into his own and stepped up", and surmised that Parslow was "perhaps the most crucial component of the side all season". He finished 2015–16 with 50 appearances and two goals, and appeared in nearly every minute of Cheltenham's 46 league matches. Cheltenham won promotion back into League Two at the first attempt, winning the National League title with 101 points. Parslow was named the Cheltenham Players' Player of the Year, and was included in the National League Team of the Year. He signed a new contract with the club in May 2016.

=== Return to York City ===
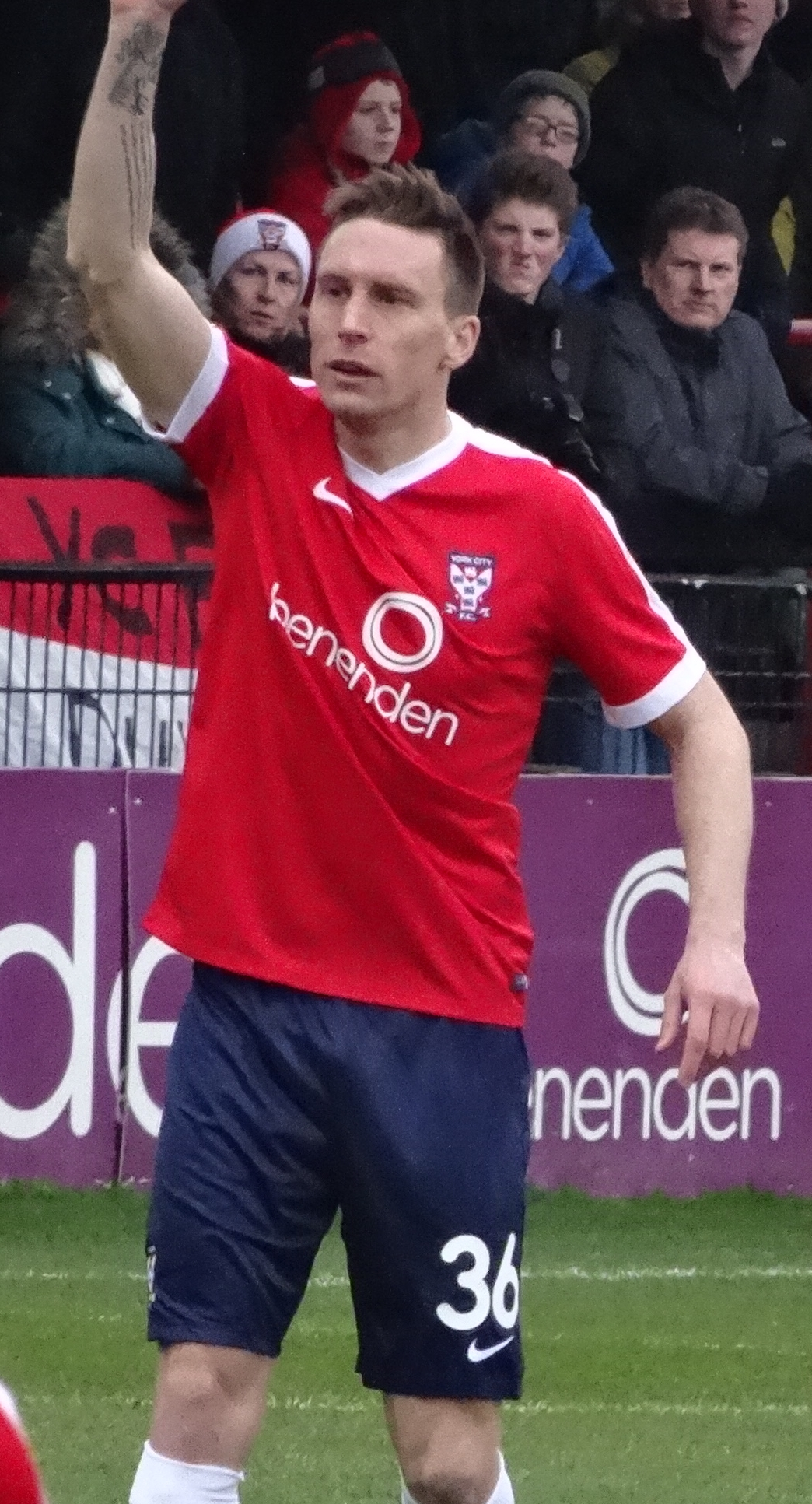
Parslow playing for York City in 2017

On 12 January 2017, Parslow rejoined York City, now in the National League, on loan for the rest of 2016–17. On 21 May 2017, he started as York beat Macclesfield Town 3–2 at Wembley Stadium in the 2017 FA Trophy Final. He was released by Cheltenham at the end of 2016–17.

Parslow re-signed for York City permanently on 30 June 2017 on a one-year contract. He left the club at the end of the 2018–19 season after rejecting an invite to return for pre-season training. He retired from playing in July 2019 because of a head injury.

== International career ==
Parslow was capped once by Wales at under-17 level, appearing as a second-half substitute in a 1–0 defeat by Germany on 13 February 2002. He made his under-19 debut after starting a 2–1 defeat by Portugal on 22 September 2003. He played two more matches for the under-19s to finish his career at that level with three caps. Parslow later represented the under-21 team and made his debut in a 0–0 draw with Latvia in August 2004. He was part of the team that lost 2–0 away against England on 8 October 2004. Parslow was capped four times by Wales at under-21 level.

He was called up by the Wales semi-pro team for the Four Nations Tournament in May 2007. Parslow's debut came as a 59th-minute substitute for Gethin Jones in their opening match, a 1–0 win over the hosts Scotland on 22 May 2007. He started the 1–1 draw with the Republic of Ireland on 25 May 2007, and was a 79th-minute substitute for Jones in the championship decider against England, which finished in a 3–0 defeat on 27 May. Parslow captained the semi-pro team for the first time in their 2–1 away defeat to England in the 2007–2009 International Challenge Trophy on 20 February 2008. He retained the armband for the 2008 Four Nations Tournament, starting all of Wales three matches as they finished in second place in the four-team group. His career with the semi-pro team finished with eight caps.

== Style of play ==
Parslow primarily played as a centre-back, and stated that he was most comfortable playing this position. A utility player, his intelligence and commitment allowed him to play a number of positions, including right-back, left-back and defensive midfield.

== Personal life ==
Parslow was born in Hengoed, mid Glamorgan. He completed a five-year degree in sports science at Manchester Metropolitan University in July 2012. He married Emma in June 2014.

== Career statistics ==
Appearances and goals by club, season and competition
Club	Season	League			FA Cup		League Cup		Other		Total	
Club	Season	Division	Apps	Goals	Apps	Goals	Apps	Goals	Apps	Goals	Apps	Goals
York City	2006–07	Conference National	24	0	0	0	—		2 (Note: Appearances in Conference National play-offs)	0	26	0
York City	2007–08	Conference Premier	31	1	0	0	—		9 (Note: Seven appearances and one goal in FA Trophy, two appearances in Conference League Cup)	1	40	2
York City	2008–09	Conference Premier	45	0	2	0	—		10 (Note: Two appearances in Conference League Cup, eight in FA Trophy)	0	57	0
York City	2009–10	Conference Premier	33	0	3	0	—		5 (Note: Four appearances in FA Trophy, one in Conference Premier play-offs)	0	41	0
York City	2010–11	Conference Premier	42	1	4	0	—		1 (Note: Appearance(s) in FA Trophy)	0	47	1
York City	2011–12	Conference Premier	27	0	1	0	—		10 (Note: Seven appearances in FA Trophy, three in Conference Premier play-offs)	0	38	0
York City	2012–13	League Two	45	1	2	0	1	0	2 (Note: Appearance(s) in Football League Trophy)	0	50	1
York City	2013–14	League Two	13	0	2	0	0	0	1	0	16	0
York City	2014–15	League Two	0	0	—		0	0	0	0	0	0
York City	Total		260	3	14	0	1	0	40	1	315	4
Grimsby Town (loan)	2014–15	Conference Premier	26	0	1	0	—		3 (Note: Two appearances in FA Trophy, one in Conference Premier play-offs)	0	30	0
Cheltenham Town	2015–16	National League	46	2	3	0	—		1	0	50	2
Cheltenham Town	2016–17	League Two	21	0	3	0	2	0	3 (Note: Appearances in EFL Trophy)	0	29	0
Cheltenham Town	Total		67	2	6	0	2	0	4	0	79	2
York City (loan)	2016–17	National League	18	0	—		—		5	0	23	0
York City	2017–18	National League North	37	2	2	0	—		1	0	40	2
York City	2018–19	National League North	3	0	1	0	—		0	0	4	0
York City	Total		58	2	3	0	—		6	0	67	2
Career total			411	7	24	0	3	0	53	1	491	8

== Honours ==
York City

- FA Trophy: 2011–12, 2016–17; runner-up: 2008–09
- Conference Premier play-offs: 2012

Cheltenham Town

- National League: 2015–16

Individual

- York City Clubman of the Year: 2008–09, 2010–11, 2012–13
- Cheltenham Town Players' Player of the Year: 2015–16
- National League Team of the Year: 2015–16
