= Phil Turnbull =

English footballer (born 1987)

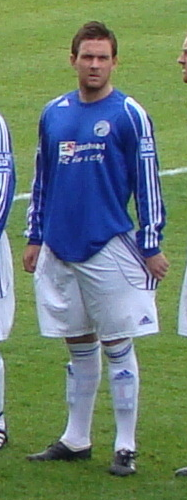
- Turnbull lining up for Gateshead in 2010

Personal information
- Full name: Philip Turnbull
- Date of birth: 7 January 1987 (age 39)
- Place of birth: South Shields, England
- Height: 5 ft 11 in (1.80 m)
- Position: Midfielder

Team information
- Current team: Dunston UTS

Youth career
- 2003–2005: Hartlepool United

Senior career*
Years	Team	Apps	(Gls)
2005–2007	Hartlepool United	0	(0)
2005–2006	→ Gateshead (loan)	5	(0)
2007	→ Blyth Spartans (loan)	11	(0)
2007–2008	York City	0	(0)
2008	→ Gateshead (loan)	5	(0)
2008–2015	Gateshead	297	(12)
2015–2018	Darlington	116	(1)
2018–2021	South Shields		
2021–	Dunston UTS	90	(2)

Managerial career
- 2017: Darlington (joint caretaker)
- * Club domestic league appearances and goals as of 19:34, 29 May 2024 (UTC)

Philip Turnbull (born 7 January 1987) is an English semi-professional footballer who plays as a midfielder for Northern Premier League Division One East club Dunston UTS.

Turnbull started his career in the youth system of Hartlepool United, and after spending a period on loan with Gateshead he made his Hartlepool debut in 2006. Following a loan with Blyth Spartans he was released by Hartlepool in 2007, before signing for Conference Premier club York City. He was loaned back to Gateshead in 2008, and after being released by York he signed for the club permanently, helping them win successive promotions from the Northern Premier League Premier Division to the Conference Premier.

== Early life ==
Born in South Shields, Tyne and Wear, Turnbull is the twin brother of fellow footballer Stephen Turnbull.

== Club career ==
=== Hartlepool United ===
Turnbull joined the Hartlepool United youth system in 2003 and was a member of the teams enjoying successful Dallas Cup campaigns in 2004 and 2005. He began to establish himself in the reserve team over the next couple of years, while still with the youth team. He joined Northern Premier League Premier Division club Gateshead on loan in December 2005, making his debut in a 0–0 home draw with Radcliffe Borough on 17 December. He made five appearances before returning to Hartlepool in February 2006.

He was given his first professional contract with Hartlepool on 4 July 2006. He made his first, and only, appearance for Hartlepool's first team after he started in the 3–1 win over League One team Rotherham United in the Football League Trophy first round on 17 October 2006. He joined Blyth Spartans of the Conference North on 22 January 2007 on a one-month loan and made 11 appearances for the club. He was released by Hartlepool in May 2007.

=== York City ===
He was signed by Conference Premier club York City on 6 July 2007. A dislocated shoulder picked up in a pre-season friendly against Frickley Athletic in July 2007 resulted in a six-month lay-off with injury. His York debut came on 12 January 2008 as a 66th-minute substitute in York's 0–0 draw at home to Grays Athletic in the FA Trophy second round.

=== Gateshead ===
Having failed to establish himself in the York team under manager Colin Walker, Turnbull rejoined Gateshead on a one-month loan in February 2008 and made his debut against Witton Albion. He agreed a permanent contract with Gateshead on 11 March 2008 after he was released by York. He scored his first career goal on 1 April 2008 in Gateshead's 2–0 win over Prescot Cables at Valerie Park. Turnbull finished the season with 18 appearances and 1 goal for Gateshead as they achieved promotion to the Conference North via the play-offs. The team achieved a second successive promotion, this time to the Conference Premier, after beating A.F.C. Telford United in the 2009 Conference North play-off Final, with Turnbull finishing the season with 49 appearances and 2 goals. He agreed a new one-year contract with the club in May 2012 to cover the 2012–13 season. Turnbull made his 300th appearance for Gateshead on 21 December 2013 in a 4–2 defeat away to Luton Town. He left Gateshead by mutual consent on 29 June 2015 to become a physical education teacher at a school in Sunderland.

=== Darlington ===
Turnbull moved into part-time football when signing for newly promoted Northern Premier League Premier Division club Darlington on 29 June 2015. He played 35 of Darlington's 46 league matches in his first season as Darlington finished as champions and were promoted to the National League North. He was again a regular as Darlington finished fifth in the National League North in 2016–17, scoring his first Darlington goal in a 2–0 home win over Gloucester City on 14 January 2017. Although finishing in a play-off position, Darlington were denied entry to the play-offs due to their Blackwell Meadows ground not meeting seating requirements.

On 5 October 2017, Turnbull and Gary Brown were appointed joint caretaker managers of Darlington. They remained in charge until Tommy Wright was appointed manager, achieving their only victory in their third and final match in charge on 21 October 2017 against Bradford Park Avenue.

=== South Shields ===
On 25 May 2018, Turnbull left Darlington to join his home-town team South Shields. He made 94 appearances in all competitions before leaving after the 2020–21 season when the end of his contract coincided with the club moving to a full-time training structure.

=== Dunston UTS ===
Turnbull remained in part-time football signing for Northern Premier League Division One East club Dunston UTS in May 2021. In May 2024, he signed a new one-year deal with the club.

== International career ==
Turnbull was called into the England under-18 squad in September 2004.

== Style of play ==
Turnbull plays as a central midfielder and is comfortable playing with either foot. He has been described as fiercely competitive and "is more than capable of getting forward to support the front men and chipping in with his fair share of goals".

== Personal life ==
He is a qualified cable jointer and during a Dunston game in November 2021, he went viral after a photo was uploaded online of him fixing the floodlights while in full kit before an electrician arrived.

== Career statistics ==
As of match played 14 January 2023

Appearances and goals by club, season and competition
Club	Season	League			FA Cup		League Cup		Other		Total	
Club	Season	Division	Apps	Goals	Apps	Goals	Apps	Goals	Apps	Goals	Apps	Goals
Hartlepool United	2005–06	League One	0	0	0	0	0	0	0	0	0	0
Hartlepool United	2006–07	League Two	0	0	0	0	0	0	1 (Note: Appearance in Football League Trophy)	0	1	0
Hartlepool United	Total		0	0	0	0	0	0	1	0	1	0
Gateshead (loan)	2005–06	Northern Premier League Premier Division	5	0	—		—		—		5	0
Blyth Spartans (loan)	2006–07	Conference North	11	0	—		—		—		11	0
York City	2007–08	Conference Premier	0	0	0	0	—		3 (Note: One appearance in Conference League Cup, two in FA Trophy)	0	3	0
Gateshead	2007–08	Northern Premier League Premier Division	15	1	—		—		3 (Note: One appearance in Northern Premier League Challenge Cup, two in Northern Premier League Premier Division play-offs)	0	18	1
Gateshead	2008–09	Conference North	40	1	3	1	—		6 (Note: Two appearances in Conference League Cup, one in FA Trophy, three in Conference North play-offs)	0	49	2
Gateshead	2009–10	Conference Premier	41	3	3	2	—		4 (Note: Appearances in FA Trophy)	0	48	5
Gateshead	2010–11	Conference Premier	46	2	1	1	—		7	1	54	4
Gateshead	2011–12	Conference Premier	41	1	3	0	—		5	0	49	1
Gateshead	2012–13	Conference Premier	46	1	1	0	—		3	0	50	1
Gateshead	2013–14	Conference Premier	45	1	3	0	—		5 (Note: Two appearances in FA Trophy, three in Conference Premier play-offs)	0	53	1
Gateshead	2014–15	Conference Premier	28	2	4	0	—		4	0	36	2
Gateshead	Total		302	12	18	4	—		37	1	357	17
Darlington	2015–16	Northern Premier League Premier Division	35	0	1	0	—		0	0	36	0
Darlington	2016–17	National League North	40	1	0	0	—		2	0	42	1
Darlington	2017–18	National League North	41	0	1	0	—		1	0	43	0
Darlington	Total		116	1	2	0	—		3	0	121	1
South Shields	2018–19	Northern Premier League Premier Division					—					
South Shields	2019–20	Northern Premier League Premier Division	26	0	2	0	—		5 (Note: Four appearances in FA Trophy, one in Northern Premier League Cup)	0	33	0
South Shields	2020–21	Northern Premier League Premier Division	5	0	3	0	—		1	0	9	0
South Shields	Total		31	0	5	0	—		6	0	42	0
Dunston UTS	2021–22	Northern Premier League Division One East	29	2	2	0	—		4 (Note: Three appearances in FA Trophy, one in Durham Challenge Cup)	0	35	2
Dunston UTS	2022–23	Northern Premier League Division One East	16	0	3	0	—		5 (Note: Four appearances in FA Trophy, one in Durham Challenge Cup)	0	24	0
Dunston UTS	Total		45	2	5	0	—		9	0	59	2
Career total			610	15	30	4	0	0	59	1	699	20

== Managerial statistics ==
As of 21 October 2017

Managerial record by team and tenure
Team	From	To	Record					Ref
Team	From	To	P	W	D	L	Win %	Ref
Darlington (joint caretaker)	5 October 2017	21 October 2017	3	1	1	1	33.3	
Total			3	1	1	1	33.3	—

== Honours ==
Gateshead

- Northern Premier League Premier Division play-offs: 2007–08
- Conference North play-offs: 2008–09

Darlington

- Northern Premier League Premier Division: 2015–16
