= David McGurk =

English footballer and manager (born 1982)

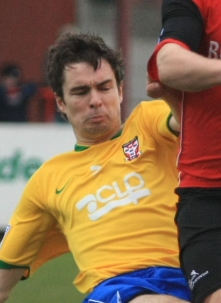
- McGurk playing for York City in 2008

Personal information
- Full name: David Michael McGurk
- Date of birth: 30 September 1982 (age 44)
- Place of birth: Middlesbrough, England
- Height: 6 ft 0 in (1.83 m)
- Position: Centre-back

Youth career
- Sunderland
- 1999–2001: Darlington

Senior career*
| Years | Team | Apps | (Gls) |
| 2001–2006 | Darlington | 56 | (6) |
| 2004 | → York City (loan) | 6 | (0) |
| 2005–2006 | → York City (loan) | 21 | (1) |
| 2006 | → York City (loan) | 15 | (1) |
| 2006–2014 | York City | 242 | (4) |
| 2014–2016 | Harrogate Town | 53 | (2) |
| 2016–2017 | Hyde United | 11 | (3) |
| Total | | 404 | (17) |

Managerial career
- 2019–2021: Hyde United
- * Club domestic league appearances and goals

David Michael McGurk (born 30 September 1982) is an English football manager and former professional player who played as a centre-back. He played in the Football League for Darlington and York City.

McGurk started his career with the Darlington's youth system and broke into the first team during the 2001–02 season. He was eventually loaned out to York City in the Conference National in 2004. He had two further loan periods with York before joining the club permanently in 2006, after making 62 appearances for Darlington. He played for the team in the play-offs in his first season and won the club's Clubman of the Year award in his second season. He played in the 2009 FA Trophy Final at Wembley Stadium and returned to the stadium for the 2010 Conference Premier play-off final.

== Career ==
=== Darlington ===
McGurk played for Marton Boys from the age of nine up until under-15 level, when he was approached by Middlesbrough and Sunderland to play matches for them. He was invited back to Middlesbrough after playing for them, but was offered a contract by Sunderland and stayed with the club for six months before being released. He started a Youth Training Scheme with Darlington in July 1999 and progressed through the club's youth system. He made his first-team debut on 17 November 2001, as a 45th-minute substitute in a 1–0 away win over Kidderminster Harriers in the FA Cup first round. He finished the 2001–02 season with 13 appearances and signed a professional contract with Darlington on 9 August 2002. He scored Darlington's equalising goal away to Kidderminster on 17 January 2004, halting a run of five 1–0 defeats out of six matches for the team during 2003–04, which helped them avoid relegation from the Third Division. He finished the season with 31 appearances and four goals.

McGurk joined Conference National club York City on 16 September 2004 on a one-month loan, after the deal had been held up due to the club's wage budget, where he made seven appearances in 2004–05. Despite York hoping to extend his loan, he returned to Darlington following its expiration on 19 October 2004 and played against Swansea City in a 2–1 away defeat on 17 November, with manager David Hodgson saying he "did very well". McGurk picked up an injury to his knee cartilage, which was operated on in December 2004, and after progressing well in his recovery made his return against Notts County on 12 February 2005, scoring Darlington's goal in a 2–1 home defeat. He was named in the League Two Team of the Week in March 2005 but later that month picked up a cartilage injury. He featured in one more match in 2004–05, which he finished with 10 appearances and two goals for Darlington.

McGurk signed a new one-year contract with Darlington in May 2005 and was soon told he was allowed to leave the club after not being guaranteed first team football for 2005–06. He was loaned out to York for a second time on 2 August 2005 on a six-month deal, so his progress could be monitored and could play regular first-team football. Darlington manager Hodgson said McGurk could have been brought back to the club when his loan at York ended, which he did having made 24 appearances and scored one goal for York. He made his first Darlington appearance in 10 months as a replacement for Shelton Martis in a 2–1 home victory over Peterborough United on 14 January 2006. However, after making one more appearance for Darlington, he rejoined York on loan until the end of 2005–06 on 24 January 2006 and finished the loan with 15 appearances and one goal. Following this "hugely successful" loan spell he made his last appearance of the season with Darlington after starting in a 1–1 home draw with Wrexham on 6 May 2006 to cover for the suspended Matthew Clarke.

=== York City ===
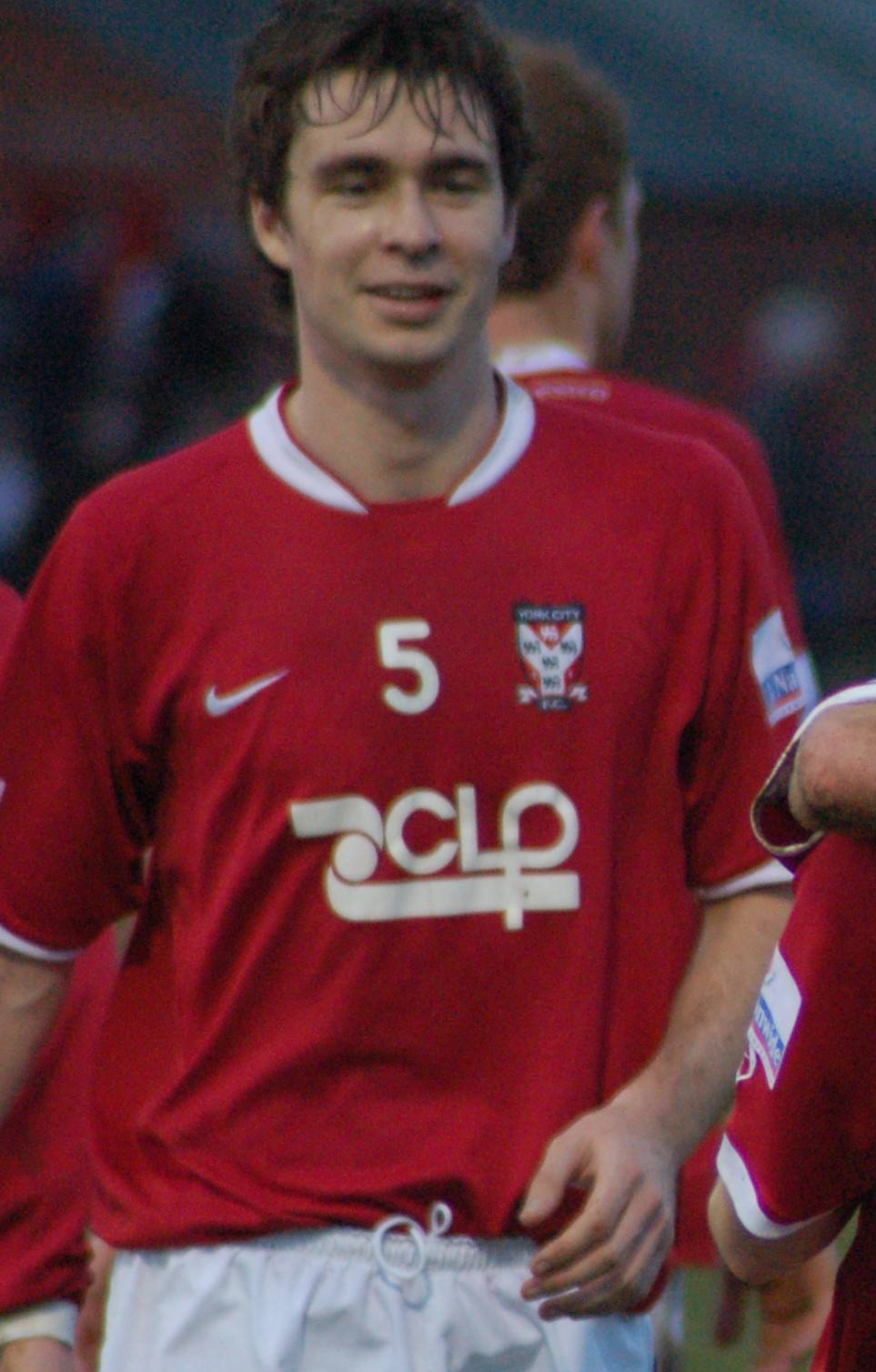
McGurk playing for York City in 2007

York manager Billy McEwan hoped to re-sign him following the end of the season and McGurk declared he wanted to join the club permanently. After turning down a new contract at Darlington he signed for York permanently on 28 June 2006. He suffered from a throat infection in October 2006, which resulted in an operation, and returned to the team in November. He played in both legs of their play-off semi-final defeat to Morecambe 2–1 on aggregate and finished 2006–07 with 41 appearances. The club exercised their option to extend his contract for 2007–08 and was later persuaded by manager Colin Walker to sign an extended contract in January 2008. He captained the team during Manny Panther's two-match omission from the squad during 2007–08, but Panther regained the captaincy after his return. He was voted by supporters as York's Clubman of the Year for 2007–08, having made 56 appearances and scored one goal during the season, missing one match.

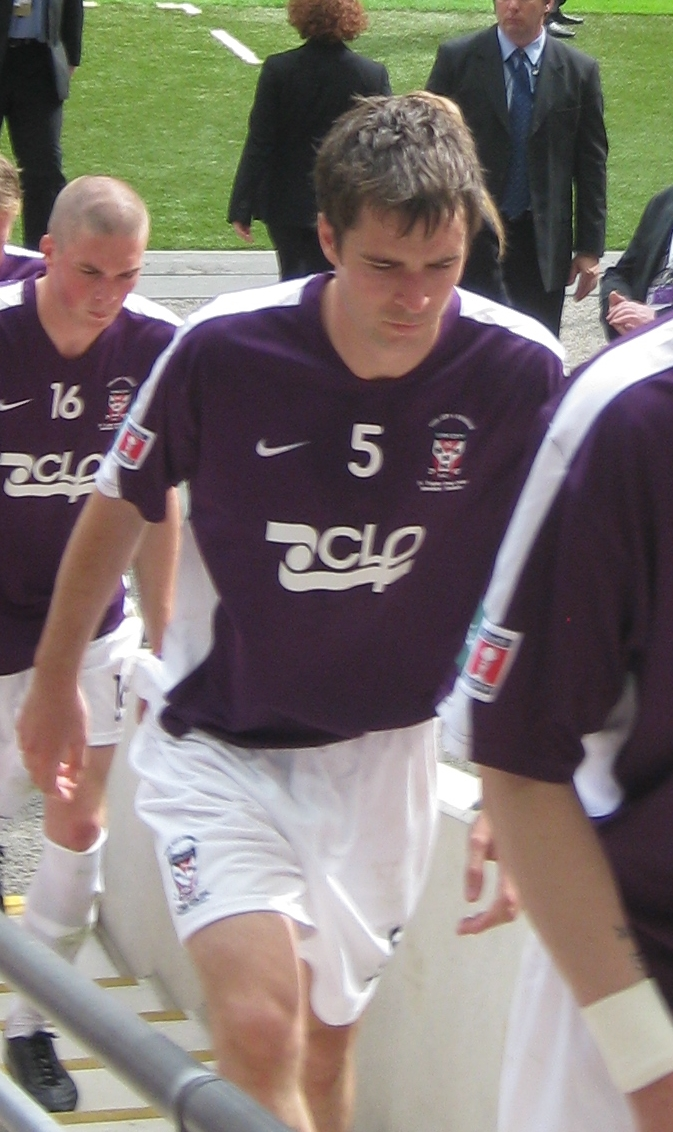
McGurk after playing for York City in the 2009 FA Trophy Final

He started 2008–09 as an ever-present in the team before pulling a calf muscle during an FA Trophy second round match away to Oxford United on 13 January 2009, which ruled him out for three weeks. He was expected to make his return ahead of schedule away to Eastbourne Borough on 24 January 2009, but was not named in the team. His return came as a 90th-minute substitute in a 0–0 away draw with Ebbsfleet United on 8 March 2009. During the period of his injury, York signed defender Shaun Pejic, whose form alongside Daniel Parslow in central defence resulted in McGurk being unable to reaffirm his place in the team. He started in the 2009 FA Trophy Final at Wembley Stadium on 9 May 2009, which York lost 2–0 to Stevenage Borough. He finished the season with 45 appearances.

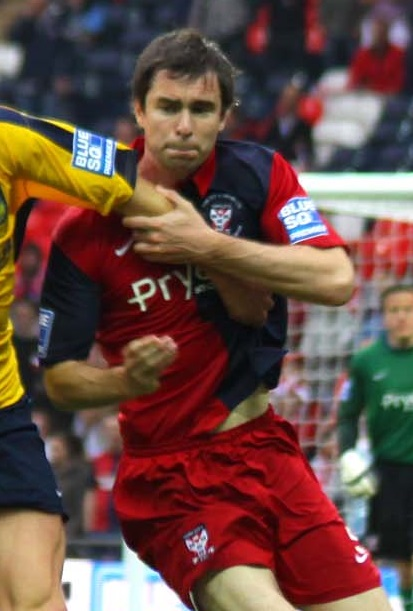
McGurk playing for York City in the 2010 Conference Premier play-off final

McGurk and Parslow were appointed as club captains for 2009–10, although Parslow would wear the armband throughout the season. He picked up a hamstring injury during a 2–1 away win over Gateshead on 25 August 2009. He captained York during their 2–0 home victory over Southern League Division One Midlands team Bedworth United in the FA Cup fourth qualifying round in October 2009, which was his 200th appearance for the club. He picked up a knee injury during a 2–1 away defeat to Forest Green Rovers on 6 March 2010, making his return as a 77th-minute substitute in a 1–0 away victory over Mansfield Town on 16 March after missing two matches. His first goal in over two years came with the equaliser at home to Altrincham on 5 April 2010, and York went on to win 2–1. He signed a new contract with the club in April 2010. McGurk played in both legs of York's play-off semi-final victory over Luton Town, which finished 2–0 on aggregate. He started in the 2010 Conference Premier play-off final at Wembley Stadium on 16 May 2010, which was lost 3–1 to Oxford. He finished the season with 46 appearances and one goal for York.

McGurk made his first appearance of 2010–11 in the opening match, a 2–1 home defeat to Kidderminster on 14 August 2010. He handed in a transfer request in November 2010 having expressed his desire to join Luton, after they had a number of bids for him rejected and he had turned down a contract extension with York. His transfer request was rejected by manager Gary Mills and McGurk explained he wanted to join Luton as he believed they offered him a better opportunity of achieving his ambition of returning to the Football League. Luton manager Richard Money eventually gave up on signing McGurk due to York demanding what he called a "ridiculous fee" for the player. However, another Luton bid was rejected after the transfer window opened in January 2011. He received the first red card of his York career after being sent off in the second minute of a 4–0 loss away to Southport on 29 January 2011. McGurk signed a new contract with York in March 2011, which contracted him to the club until the summer of 2013. An ankle ligament injury suffered in a 2–1 home victory over Newport County on 9 April 2011 ruled him out for the rest of the season, during which he made 40 appearances.

=== Later career ===
McGurk retired from professional football in May 2014 as a result of injury problems, but remained playing as a part-timer after signing for Conference North club Harrogate Town on 2 June. He made his debut in a 0–0 home draw with Tamworth on the opening day of 2014–15 on 9 August 2014. His first goal for the club came on 20 September 2014 in Harrogate's 3–1 away win over Leamington, side footing the ball into the goal from an Adam Nowakowski cross in the 85th minute. McGurk was voted by supporters as Harrogate's Player of the Year for 2014–15, in which he made 36 appearances and scored two goals.

== Coaching and managerial career ==
McGurk signed for newly relegated Northern Premier League Division One North club Hyde United in June 2016 on a one-year contract, as a player and as assistant manager to Darren Kelly. He made 15 appearances and scored 4 goals in 2016–17. McGurk was appointed as manager on 28 May 2019 with John McCombe as his assistant, while Kelly took on the role of sporting director. He resigned for personal reasons in August 2022.

== Style of play ==
McGurk played as a centre-back and was described by The Sentinel as a "reliable performer at the heart of defence".

== Personal life ==
McGurk was born in Middlesbrough, North Yorkshire. He founded the Pro Player Football Academy with John McCombe in July 2014.

== Career statistics ==
Appearances and goals by club, season and competition
| Club | Season | League | | | FA Cup | | League Cup | | Other | | Total | |
| Club | Season | Division | Apps | Goals | Apps | Goals | Apps | Goals | Apps | Goals | Apps | Goals |
|---|---|---|---|---|---|---|---|---|---|---|---|---|
| Darlington | 2001–02 | Third Division | 12 | 0 | 1 | 0 | 0 | 0 | 0 | 0 | 13 | 0 |
| Darlington | 2002–03 | Third Division | 4 | 0 | 0 | 0 | 1 | 0 | 1 (Note: Appearance in Football League Trophy) | 0 | 6 | 0 |
| Darlington | 2003–04 | Third Division | 27 | 4 | 1 | 0 | 2 | 0 | 1 | 0 | 31 | 4 |
| Darlington | 2004–05 | League Two | 10 | 2 | 0 | 0 | 0 | 0 | — | | 10 | 2 |
| Darlington | 2005–06 | League Two | 3 | 0 | — | | — | | — | | 3 | 0 |
| Darlington | Total | | 56 | 6 | 2 | 0 | 3 | 0 | 2 | 0 | 63 | 6 |
| York City (loan) | 2004–05 | Conference National | 6 | 0 | — | | — | | 1 | 0 | 7 | 0 |
| York City (loan) | 2005–06 | Conference National | 36 | 2 | 2 | 0 | — | | 1 (Note: Appearance(s) in FA Trophy) | 0 | 39 | 2 |
| York City | 2006–07 | Conference National | 38 | 0 | 0 | 0 | — | | 3 (Note: One appearance in FA Trophy, two in Conference National play-offs) | 0 | 41 | 0 |
| York City | 2007–08 | Conference Premier | 46 | 1 | 2 | 0 | — | | 8 (Note: Seven appearances in FA Trophy, one in Conference League Cup) | 0 | 56 | 1 |
| York City | 2008–09 | Conference Premier | 37 | 0 | 2 | 0 | — | | 6 (Note: One appearance in Conference League Cup, five in FA Trophy) | 0 | 45 | 0 |
| York City | 2009–10 | Conference Premier | 34 | 1 | 4 | 0 | — | | 8 (Note: Five appearances in FA Trophy, three in Conference Premier play-offs) | 0 | 46 | 1 |
| York City | 2010–11 | Conference Premier | 34 | 0 | 5 | 0 | — | | 1 | 0 | 40 | 0 |
| York City | 2011–12 | Conference Premier | 19 | 1 | 1 | 0 | — | | 2 | 0 | 22 | 1 |
| York City | 2012–13 | League Two | 11 | 0 | 0 | 0 | 0 | 0 | 0 | 0 | 11 | 0 |
| York City | 2013–14 | League Two | 23 | 1 | 1 | 0 | 1 | 0 | 0 | 0 | 25 | 1 |
| York City | Total | | 284 | 6 | 17 | 0 | 1 | 0 | 30 | 0 | 332 | 6 |
| Harrogate Town | 2014–15 | Conference North | 34 | 2 | 0 | 0 | — | | 2 | 0 | 36 | 2 |
| Harrogate Town | 2015–16 | National League North | 19 | 0 | 1 | 0 | — | | 1 | 0 | 21 | 0 |
| Harrogate Town | Total | | 53 | 2 | 1 | 0 | — | | 3 | 0 | 57 | 2 |
| Hyde United | 2016–17 | Northern Premier League; Division One North | 11 | 3 | 3 | 1 | — | | 1 | 0 | 15 | 4 |
| Career total | | | 404 | 17 | 23 | 1 | 4 | 0 | 36 | 0 | 467 | 18 |

== Managerial statistics ==
As of end of 2020–21 season

Managerial record by team and tenure
| Team | From | To | Record | | | | |
| Team | From | To | P | W | D | L | Win % |
|---|---|---|---|---|---|---|---|
| Hyde United | 28 May 2019 | August 2021 | 39 | 13 | 10 | 16 | 33.3 |
| Total | | | 39 | 13 | 10 | 16 | 33.3 |

== Honours ==
Individual

- York City Clubman of the Year: 2007–08
- Harrogate Town Player of the Year: 2014–15
