= Joey Hutchinson =

English footballer (born 1982)

Personal information
- Full name: Jonathan Hutchinson
- Date of birth: 2 April 1982 (age 44)
- Place of birth: Middlesbrough, England
- Height: 6 ft 0 in (1.83 m)
- Position: Centre back

Youth career
- –2000: Birmingham City

Senior career*
Years	Team	Apps	(Gls)
2000–2003	Birmingham City	4	(0)
2003–2007	Darlington	79	(0)
2007	York City	3	(0)
2008–?	Harrogate Town	0	(0)
- * Club domestic league appearances and goals

Jonathan "Joey" Hutchinson (born 2 April 1982) is an English former professional footballer who played as a centre back.

== Career ==
Born in Middlesbrough, Cleveland, Hutchinson signed a professional contract with Birmingham City on 1 July 2000, having been a trainee in the club's youth system, and was a member of the first-team squad for the 2000–01 season. After Birmingham were promoted to the Premier League Hutchinson made his first appearance in the competition, starting in a defeat to Leeds United.

He was told in May 2005 he would only be offered an extension to his Darlington contract if he could convince the club he was over his injury problems. After being sent off and conceding a penalty in a game against Wrexham in October 2005, Hutchinson was to be punished by Darlington for comments he made to the referee. Hutchinson missed the rest of the 2005–06 season with cruciate knee ligament damage.

Hutchinson returned from two separate cruciate ligament injuries in June 2006. Hutchinson was released by Darlington in February 2007 due to recurring injury problems. He impressed whilst on trial with Hereford United during the 2007 pre-season, but was not offered a contract as he lacked what manager Graham Turner wanted physically. He eventually joined Conference National club York City on non-contract terms on 10 August 2007. He was released by the club on 31 August, as he wanted to move closer to his family in the Midlands. Since leaving York, he had a trial with Burton Albion.

Hutchinson signed for Harrogate Town of the Conference North in July 2008, but failed to make any appearances for the club.

== Personal life ==
In June 2016, Hutchinson severed his spinal cord after falling into a swimming pool in Spain. This resulted in him being paralysed and needing to use a wheelchair. His claim against Wayne Lineker, the owner of the Ibiza beach club, where the accident occurred moved to the High Court in January 2020.

== Career statistics ==
Appearances and goals by club, season and competition
Club	Season	League^{[A]}		FA Cup		League Cup		Other^{[B]}		Total	
Club	Season	Apps	Goals	Apps	Goals	Apps	Goals	Apps	Goals	Apps	Goals
Birmingham City	2000–01	0	0	0	0	0	0	0	0	0	0
Birmingham City	2001–02	3	0	0	0	1	0	0	0	4	0
Birmingham City	2002–03	1	0	1	0	1	0	0	0	3	0
Birmingham City	Total	4	0	1	0	2	0	0	0	7	0
Darlington	2003–04	39	0	1	0	1	0	1	0	42	0
Darlington	2004–05	8	0	0	0	1	0	0	0	9	0
Darlington	2005–06	19	0	0	0	1	0	1	0	21	0
Darlington	2006–07	13	0	0	0	1	0	0	0	14	0
Darlington	Total	79	0	1	0	4	0	2	0	86	0
York City	2007–08	3	0	0	0	0	0	0	0	3	0
Harrogate Town	2008–09	0	0	0	0	0	0	0	0	0	0
Career totals		86	0	2	0	6	0	2	0	96	0

== Footnotes ==
A. The "League" column constitutes appearances and goals (including those as a substitute) in the Premier League, Football League and Football Conference.
B. The "Other" column constitutes appearances and goals (including those as a substitute) in the Football League Trophy.
