= Carl Jones (footballer) =

British footballer (born 1986)

Personal information
- Full name: Carl Michael Jones
- Date of birth: 3 September 1986 (age 40)
- Place of birth: Sunderland, England
- Height: 6 ft 1 in (1.85 m)
- Position: Defender

Team information
- Current team: Shildon

Youth career
- Hartlepool United
- 1999–2005: Chester-le-Street Town
- 2005: Hartlepool United

Senior career*
Years	Team	Apps	(Gls)
2005–2007	Hartlepool United	1	(0)
2007–2008	York City	2	(0)
2007–2008	→ Gateshead (loan)	4	(0)
2008–2011	Gateshead	76	(5)
2011–2012	Blyth Spartans		
2012	Darlington 1883	0	(0)
2012–	Shildon		
- * Club domestic league appearances and goals as of 18:00, 8 December 2012 (UTC)

Carl Michael Jones (born 3 September 1986) is an English footballer and who plays for Shildon as a defender.

== Career ==
Born in Sunderland, Tyne and Wear, Jones played for the Hartlepool United youth system in their under-11 to under-16 teams. After being released by the club he joined Chester-le-Street Town during the 2002–03 season before returning to Hartlepool in July 2005. He made his first team debut after starting in a 1–0 defeat to Yeovil Town on 2 September and in a 1–0 defeat at Scunthorpe United in the Football League Trophy on 18 October he conceded a penalty kick that was scored after being adjudged to have handled the ball, before being substituted in the 84th minute with a suspected calf injury. He finished the 2005–06 season with two appearances and was rewarded with a new contract in June 2006. Jones failed to make any appearances during the 2006–07 season and the club announced that he would be released when his contract expired on 30 June 2007.

He went on trial with Conference Premier team York City in July 2007 and after impressing he signed for the club on a one-year contract on 7 August. Jones made his debut in York's opening game of the 2007–08 season, a 2–1 defeat to Cambridge United on 11 August. He was described by Steve Carroll of The Press as looking "out of depth" in the team's next game, a 4–3 defeat at Burton Albion on 14 August, which was to be his final appearance for York. He suffered a suspected fractured cheekbone after accidentally clashing with Chris Beardsley during a training session in September.

He joined Northern Premier League Premier Division team Gateshead on an initial one-month loan in November 2007. The loan was extended in January 2008 and after being released by York on 31 January he joined Gateshead permanently. Jones made a total of 95 appearances in all competitions for Gateshead, scoring 5 goals, before his release on 4 May 2011.

Jones signed for Blyth Spartans on 29 June 2011, making his competitive debut on 27 August in a 0–2 defeat at Gainsborough Trinity. Jones left Blyth on 4 November 2011 and subsequently signed for Darlington 1883. After less than a month at Darlington, Jones signed for fellow Northern League side Shildon on 29 November 2012.

== Career statistics ==
=== Club ===
As of 30 April 2011

Appearances and goals by club, season and competition
Club	Season	League^{[A]}		FA Cup		League Cup		Other^{[B]}		Total	
Club	Season	Apps	Goals	Apps	Goals	Apps	Goals	Apps	Goals	Apps	Goals
Hartlepool United	2005–06	1	0	0	0	0	0	1	0	2	0
Hartlepool United	2006–07	0	0	0	0	0	0	0	0	0	0
Hartlepool United	Total	1	0	0	0	0	0	1	0	2	0
York City	2007–08	2	0	0	0	0	0	0	0	2	0
Gateshead (loan)	2007–08	4	0	0	0	0	0	1	0	5	0
Gateshead	2007–08	15	2	0	0	0	0	4	0	19	2
Gateshead	2008–09	32	3	0	0	0	0	6	0	38	3
Gateshead	2009–10	10	0	0	0	0	0	2	0	12	0
Gateshead	2010–11	19	0	0	0	0	0	2	0	21	0
Gateshead	Total	80	5	0	0	0	0	15	0	95	5
Career totals		83	5	0	0	0	0	16	0	99	5

A. The "League" column constitutes appearances and goals (including those as a substitute) in the Football League, Football Conference and Northern Premier League.
B. The "Other" column constitutes appearances and goals (including those as a substitute) in the FA Trophy, Football League Trophy, Conference League Cup, Northern Premier League Challenge Cup and play-offs.
