= Clint Davies =

Australian soccer player

Personal information
- Full name: Clint Aaron Davies
- Date of birth: 24 April 1983 (age 43)
- Place of birth: Perth, Australia
- Position: Goalkeeper

Senior career*
Years	Team	Apps	(Gls)
2002–2003	Birmingham City	0	(0)
2003	→ Tamworth (loan)		
2003	→ Nuneaton Borough (loan)	4	(0)
2003	→ Woking (loan)	2	(0)
2003–2005	Bradford City	2	(0)
2003–2004	Halifax Town	8	(0)
2005–2006	Woking	2	(0)
- * Club domestic league appearances and goals as of 00:10, 24 October 2007 (UTC)

Clint Aaron Davies (born 24 April 1983) is a professional footballer who plays as a goalkeeper. He played in the Football League for Bradford City.
