= Sam Duncum =

English footballer

Personal information
- Full name: Samuel Duncum
- Date of birth: 18 February 1987 (age 39)
- Place of birth: Sheffield, England
- Position: Winger

Youth career
- ?–2005: Rotherham United

Senior career*
| Years | Team | Apps | (Gls) |
| 2005–2008 | Rotherham United | 13 | (0) |
| 2008 | → York City (loan) | 7 | (0) |
| 2008–2010 | Ilkeston Town | 44 | |
| 2010–2011 | Eastwood Town | 52 | |
| 2010 | → Worksop Town (loan) | | |
| 2011 | → Worksop Town (loan) | | |
| 2011–2012 | Worksop Town | | |
| 2012 | Ilkeston | 65 | (5) |
| 2012–2013 | Buxton | | |
| 2013–???? | Belper Town | | |
- * Club domestic league appearances and goals

Samuel Duncum (born 18 February 1987) is an English retired professional and semi-professional footballer who played for Rotherham United, York City, Lincoln United, Ilkeston Town, Eastwood Town, Belper Town, Buxton FC and Worksop Town as a winger.

== Career ==
Born in Sheffield, South Yorkshire, Dumcum started his career with Rotherham United in 2005 and made his debut in a 3–1 defeat to Gillingham in the Football League Championship on 5 March 2005. He finished the 2004–05 season with two appearances and made one appearance the subsequent season. He made two substitute appearances during the 2006–07 season as Rotherham were relegated to League Two.

He joined Conference Premier side York City on a one-month loan on 20 February 2008, which was extended for a further month in March, despite his having aggravated a hamstring injury. He finished this loan spell in April with three appearances and was invited to return to the club in pre-season to attempt to win a contract. He however signed for Ilkeston Town in May.

Following two loan spells with Worksop Town during the 2010–11 season, Duncum joined the club on a permanent basis in June 2011.

After being released by Worksop in January 2012, he returned to the New Manor Ground, signing for Ilkeston. Duncum's first goal for the reformed club came in his second appearance, scoring in a Derbyshire Senior Cup quarter-final against Buxton. However, Duncum was subsequently found to have been ineligible for the competition, resulting in Ilkeston's disqualification. Including this voided game, he made 15 appearances for the club in all competitions, scoring six goals as Ilkeston were promoted via the playoffs. He subsequently played for Buxton and Belper Town.
