= 2007–08 FA Trophy =

FA Challenge Trophy

Tournament details
- Country: England; Wales
- Teams: 258

Final positions
- Champions: Ebbsfleet United
- Runners-up: Torquay United

Tournament statistics
- Matches played: 257

The 2007–08 FA Trophy was the 38th season of the FA's cup competition for teams at levels 5–8 of the English football league system. 258 teams were entered for the competition.

== Calendar ==
Round	Date	Matches	Clubs	New entries this round	Prize money
Preliminary round	6 October 2007	46	258 → 212	92	£1,000
First round qualifying	20 October 2007	72	212 → 140	66	£1,500
Second round qualifying	3 November 2007	36	140 → 104	none	£2,000
Third round qualifying	24 November 2007	40	104 → 64	44	£3,000
First round	15 December 2007	32	64 → 32	24	£4,000
Second round	12 January 2008	16	32 → 16	none	£5,000
Third round	2 February 2008	8	16 → 8	none	£6,000
Fourth round	23 February 2008	4	8 → 4	none	£8,000
Semi-finals	8 March and 15 March 2008	2	4 → 2	none	£16,000
Final	10 May 2008	1	2 → 1	none	£50,000

== Preliminary round ==
· Ties will be played on 6 October 2007.

=== Ties ===
Tie	Home team	Score	Away team
1	Garforth Town	2–3	Shepshed Dynamo
2	Clitheroe	2–1	Ossett Albion
3	Quorn	1–1	Bridlington Town
4	Kidsgrove Athletic	0–1	Chasetown
5	Skelmersdale United	1–0	Goole
6	Grantham Town	3–0	Alsager Town
7	Brigg Town	2–2	Gresley Rovers
8	Bradford Park Avenue	1–1	F C United Of Manchester
9	Cammell Laird	0–1	Curzon Ashton
10	Warrington Town	3–2	Rossendale United
11	Woodley Sports	1–1	Newcastle Blue Star
12	Sutton Coldfield Town	1–3	Radcliffe Borough
13	Belper Town	1–1	Willenhall Town
14	Rushall Olympic	2–1	Carlton Town
15	Spalding United	0–4	Romulus
16	Chatham Town	3–1	Kingstonian
17	Walton Casuals	1–3	Barton Rovers
18	Rothwell Town	1–2	Sittingbourne
19	Great Wakering Rovers	2–1	Tilbury
20	Waltham Forest	0–7	Arlesey Town
21	Canvey Island	3–1	Wingate & Finchley
22	Wivenhoe Town	0–2	Corinthian-Casuals
23	Chesham United	2–1	Waltham Abbey
24	Enfield Town	1–2	Aylesbury United
25	Dover Athletic	3–0	Potters Bar Town
26	Chipstead	1–1	Tooting & Mitcham United
27	Ilford	2–2	Aveley
28	Maldon Town	2–2	Croydon Athletic
29	Whitstable Town	0–2	Cray Wanderers
30	Leighton Town	3–1	Molesey
31	Berkhamsted Town	0–3	Walton & Hersham
32	Brentwood Town	1–0	Dulwich Hamlet
33	Worthing	2–1	Whyteleafe
34	Burgess Hill Town	0–2	Ware
35	Bury Town	0–0	Redbridge
36	Slough Town	1–1	Hillingdon Borough
37	Thatcham Town	0–4	Farnborough
38	Bishops Cleeve	0–4	Oxford City
39	Godalming Town	1–2	Taunton Town
40	Gosport Borough	1–0	Paulton Rovers
41	Malvern Town	1–3	Didcot Town
42	Windsor & Eton	2–0	Bridgwater Town
43	Fleet Town	5–0	Newport I O W
44	Andover	4–2	A F C Hayes
45	Cinderford Town	4–0	Stourport Swifts
46	Leamington	2–0	Marlow

=== Replays ===
Tie	Home team	Score	Away team
3	Bridlington Town	3–1	Quorn
7	Gresley Rovers	3–3	Brigg Town
	(Gresley Rovers won 3–1 on penalties)		
8	F C United of Manchester	1–4	Bradford Park Avenue
11	Newcastle Blue Star	1–0	Woodley Sports
13	Willenhall Town	3–2	Belper Town
26	Tooting & Mitcham United	1–2	Chipstead
27	Aveley	0–2	Ilford
28	Croydon Athletic	2–4	Maldon Town
35	Redbridge	0–3	Bury Town
36	Hillingdon Borough	2–1	Slough Town

== 1st qualifying round ==
Ties will be played on 20 October 2007

Teams from Premier Division of Southern League, Northern Premier League and Isthmian League entered in this round.

=== Ties ===
Tie	Home team	Score	Away team
1	Prescot Cables	2–3	Frickley Athletic
2	Buxton	2–1	Leek Town
3	Romulus	0–1	Warrington Town
4	Stocksbridge Park Steels	3–1	Skelmersdale United
5	Stamford	2–2	Matlock Town
6	Harrogate Railway Athletic	2–4	Radcliffe Borough
7	Gateshead	2–1	Shepshed Dynamo
8	Mossley	0–1	Rushall Olympic
9	Colwyn Bay	2–1	Newcastle Blue Star
10	Gresley Rovers	0–1	Guiseley
11	Witton Albion	6–1	Ashton United
12	North Ferriby United	1–1	Ilkeston Town
13	Grantham Town	1–3	Kendal Town
14	Clitheroe	0–0	Lancaster City
15	Fleetwood Town	1–0	Worksop Town
16	Chasetown w/o-scr Scarborough		
17	Willenhall Town	1–3	Hednesford Town
18	Eastwood Town	0–1	Bamber Bridge
19	Chorley	1–2	Curzon Ashton
20	Bradford Park Avenue	0–2	Sheffield
21	Bridlington Town	0–2	Retford United
22	Wakefield	1–1	Nantwich Town
23	Ossett Town	3–2	Whitby Town
24	Marine	5–0	Lincoln United
25	Billericay Town	2–1	Ilford
26	Tonbridge Angels	3–2	Harrow Borough
27	Brentwood Town	1–1	Harlow Town
28	Ashford Town (Kent)	1–4	Leyton
29	Chatham Town	0–3	Witham Town
30	Aylesbury United	0–0	Margate
31	Walton & Hersham	2–1	Folkestone Invicta
32	Chesham United	2–1	Bedford Town
33	Bury Town	1–1	Maidstone United
34	Metropolitan Police	3–0	Great Wakering Rovers
35	Leighton Town	0–0	Wealdstone
36	Ware	4–1	Ashford Town (Middx)
37	Sittingbourne	0–2	Northwood
38	Cheshunt	1–2	Heybridge Swifts
39	Boreham Wood	1–2	Chelmsford City
40	Chipstead	1–3	Worthing
41	Dunstable Town	1–1	Hemel Hempstead Town
42	Ramsgate	2–3	Horsham
43	East Thurrock United	3–3	Cray Wanderers
44	Horsham Y M C A	1–3	Canvey Island
45	A F C Hornchurch	0–0	Dartford
46	Edgware Town	1–2	Hastings United
47	Carshalton Athletic	2–1	Corinthian-Casuals
48	A F C Wimbledon	2–1	Hendon
49	Maldon Town	1–2	Dover Athletic
50	Hitchin Town	3–0	Eastbourne Town
51	A F C Sudbury	0–0	King's Lynn
52	Corby Town	4–1	Barton Rovers
53	Leatherhead	3–0	Arlesey Town
54	Halesowen Town	0–2	Brackley Town
55	Cinderford Town	2–1	Cirencester Town
56	Evesham United	1–0	Bromsgrove Rovers
57	Mangotsfield United	0–0	Fleet Town
58	Chippenham Town	3–0	Merthyr Tydfil
59	Slimbridge scr-w/o Bashley		
60	Swindon Supermarine	1–1	Farnborough
61	Tiverton Town	0–1	Burnham
62	Oxford City	0–1	Windsor & Eton
63	Winchester City	2–2	Gosport Borough
64	Stourbridge	1–1	Gloucester City
65	Leamington	2–0	Banbury United
66	Hillingdon Borough	1–1	Bedworth United
67	Yate Town	2–1	Didcot Town
68	Woodford United	2–0	Bracknell Town
69	Rugby Town	1–3	Clevedon Town
70	Team Bath	1–0	Taunton Town
71	Uxbridge	4–1	Andover
72	Staines Town	0–0	Abingdon United

=== Replays ===
Tie	Home team	Score	Away team
5	Matlock Town	1–0	Stamford
12	Ilkeston Town	4–1	North Ferriby United
14	Lancaster City	1–2	Clitheroe
22	Nantwich Town	2–3	Wakefield
27	Harlow Town	0–1	Brentwood Town
30	Margate	3–1	Aylesbury United
33	Maidstone United	3–1	Bury Town
35	Wealdstone	2–1	Leighton Town
41	Hemel Hempstead Town	2–1	Dunstable Town
43	Cray Wanderers	2–3	East Thurrock United
45	Dartford	0–3	A F C Hornchurch
51	King's Lynn	2–1	A F C Sudbury
57	Fleet Town	0–2	Mangotsfield United
60	Farnborough	1–0	Swindon Supermarine
63	Gosport Borough	2–1	Winchester City
65	Gloucester City	2–0	Stourbridge
66	Bedworth United	1–2	Hillingdon Borough
72	Abingdon United	5–2	Staines Town

== 2nd qualifying round ==
· Ties will be played on 3 November 2007.

=== Ties ===
Tie	Home team	Score	Away team
1	Stocksbridge Park Steels	2–5	Witton Albion
2	Curzon Ashton	1–3	Ilkeston Town
3	Warrington Town	0–3	Ossett Town
4	Bamber Bridge	1–1	Marine
5	Hednesford Town	1–2	Guiseley
6	Fleetwood Town	1–1	Retford United
7	Frickley Athletic	1–2	Colwyn Bay
8	Chasetown	0–0	Radcliffe Borough
9	Wakefield	0–2	Buxton
10	Matlock Town	1–2	Gateshead
11	Rushall Olympic	1–1	Clitheroe
	(Clitheroe played ineligible player – awarded to Rushall)		
12	Sheffield	3–2	Kendal Town
13	Hitchin Town	2–1	Cinderford Town
14	Chippenham Town	3–2	Heybridge Swifts
15	Leatherhead	1–1	Mangotsfield United
16	A F C Wimbledon	4–0	Chelmsford City
17	Abingdon United	2–2	Maidstone United
18	Woodford United	1–4	Wealdstone
19	Bashley	3–1	Leyton
20	Tonbridge Angels	2–0	East Thurrock United
21	Brentwood Town	0–2	Canvey Island
22	Yate Town	0–3	Carshalton Athletic
23	Farnborough	1–3	Windsor & Eton
24	Burnham	2–1	Ware
25	A F C Hornchurch	2–2	Northwood
26	Gloucester City	3–3	Hillingdon Borough
27	Worthing	0–0	Walton & Hersham
28	Corby Town	2–2	Evesham United
29	Gosport Borough	3–2	Metropolitan Police
30	Witham Town	3–2	Horsham
31	King's Lynn	2–2	Billericay Town
32	Uxbridge	1–0	Hastings United
33	Hemel Hempstead Town	2–1	Clevedon Town
34	Leamington	1–1	Margate
35	Dover Athletic	2–1	Brackley Town
36	Chesham United	3–5	Team Bath

=== Replays ===
Tie	Home team	Score	Away team
4	Marine	2–3	Bamber Bridge
6	Retford United	5–1	Fleetwood Town
8	Radcliffe Borough	2–1	Chasetown
15	Mangotsfield United	1–1	Leatherhead
	(Leatherhead won 4–1 on penalties)		
17	Maidstone United	5–3	Abingdon United
25	Northwood	2–1	A F C Hornchurch
26	Hillingdon Borough	0–1	Gloucester City
27	Walton & Hersham	1–3	Worthing
28	Evesham United	4–2	Corby Town
31	Billericay Town	1–3	King's Lynn
34	Margate	0–1	Leamington

== 3rd qualifying round ==
The teams from Conference North and Conference South entered in this round.

Ties will be played on 24 November 2007.

=== Ties ===
Tie	Home team	Score	Away team
1	Gateshead	2–1	Boston United
2	Solihull Moors	1–4	Cambridge City
3	Retford United	3–1	Radcliffe Borough
4	Guiseley	1–0	Worcester City
5	Evesham United	1–1	Redditch United
6	Rushall Olympic	0–0	Ossett Town
7	Bamber Bridge	2–1	Ilkeston Town
8	Hinckley United	1–3	Alfreton Town
9	Colwyn Bay	1–1	Sheffield
10	Vauxhall	1–0	Hyde United
11	Blyth Spartans	2–2	Gainsborough Trinity
12	Barrow	2–3	Southport
13	Burscough	2–3	Leigh R M I
14	Hucknall Town	1–1	Witton Albion
15	Nuneaton Borough	0–0	Workington
16	Buxton	0–1	A F C Telford United
17	Stalybridge Celtic	0–2	Tamworth
18	Harrogate Town	0–3	Kettering Town
19	Bromley	2–1	Chippenham Town
20	Bishop's Stortford	2–1	Hampton & Richmond Borough
21	Hemel Hempstead Town	3–0	Team Bath
22	A F C Wimbledon	2–1	Northwood
23	Maidstone United	0–1	Canvey Island
24	Basingstoke Town	1–4	Lewes
25	Gosport Borough	1–4	Braintree Town
26	Dorchester Town	1–1	Worthing
27	Fisher Athletic London	1–2	Leamington
28	Bognor Regis Town	2–1	Havant & Waterlooville
29	Bashley	4–0	Leatherhead
30	Gloucester City	1–0	Uxbridge
31	Hayes & Yeading United	4–2	Witham Town
32	Carshalton Athletic	1–1	Hitchin Town
33	Eastleigh	4–2	Weston super Mare
34	Windsor & Eton	1–2	Newport County
35	Bath City	2–0	Thurrock
36	Tonbridge Angels	1–0	Burnham
37	Wealdstone	1–0	Welling United
38	King's Lynn	3–1	Eastbourne Borough
39	Maidenhead United	2–0	St Albans City
40	Dover Athletic	1–1	Sutton United

=== Replays ===
Tie	Home team	Score	Away team
5	Redditch United	1–0	Evesham United
6	Ossett Town	3–2	Rushall Olympic
9	Sheffield	2–2	Colwyn Bay
	(Colwyn Bay won 5–4 on penalties)		
11	Gainsborough Trinity	1–1	Blyth Spartans
	(Blyth won 3–1 on penalties)		
14	Witton Albion	1–2	Hucknall Town
15	Workington	2–1	Nuneaton Borough
26	Worthing	1–2	Dorchester Town
32	Hitchin Town	1–2	Carshalton Athletic
40	Sutton United	1–0	Dover Athletic

== First round ==
This round is the first in which Conference Premier teams join those from lower reaches of the National League System.

Ties will be played on 15 December 2007.

=== Ties ===
Tie	Home team	Score	Away team	Attendance
1	A.F.C. Telford United	1 – 2	Blyth Spartans	1,120
2	Vauxhall Motors	2 – 1	Northwich Victoria	462
3	Alfreton Town	1 – 0	Southport	187
4	Halifax Town	2 – 1	Leamington	805
5	Stafford Rangers	3 – 1	Ossett Town	521
6	Colwyn Bay	1 – 2	Burton Albion	382
7	Bamber Bridge	2 – 3	Rushden & Diamonds	330
8	Droylsden	2 – 1	Redditch United	239
9	Histon	5 – 2	Retford United	316
10	Gateshead	1 – 1	Farsley Celtic	238
11	Cambridge United	5 – 0	King's Lynn	2,311
12	Hucknall Town	0 – 1	Tamworth	265
13	Leigh RMI	1 – 3	Workington	101
14	Guiseley	1 – 2	Kidderminster Harriers	312
15	Cambridge City	3 – 2	Kettering Town	531
16	Altrincham	1 – 3	York City	752
17	Gloucester City	0 – 2	Braintree Town	269
18	Hemel Hempstead Town	0 – 1	Woking	453
19	Grays Athletic	3 – 0	Lewes	401
20	Maidenhead United	0 – 2	AFC Wimbledon	1,157
21	Dorchester Town	2 – 1	Stevenage Borough	321
22	Bishop's Stortford	8 – 0	Canvey Island	359
23	Torquay United	1 – 0	Bashley	1,277
24	Crawley Town	1 – 0	Bromley	667
25	Newport County	2 – 0	Bath City	592
26	Ebbsfleet United	4 – 1	Carshalton Athletic	492
27	Oxford United	0 – 0	Tonbridge Angels	1,508
28	Wealdstone	0 – 1	Weymouth	343
29	Sutton United	1 – 4	Forest Green Rovers	303
30	Hayes & Yeading United	0 – 5	Aldershot Town	435
31	Exeter City	3 – 0	Salisbury City	2,151
32	Eastleigh	1 – 0	Bognor Regis Town	218

=== Replays ===
Tie	Home team	Score	Away team	Attendance
10	Farsley Celtic	4 – 1	Gateshead	92
27	Tonbridge Angels	1 – 0	Oxford United	642

== Second round ==
- The draw was made on 17 December 2007.
- Ties will be played on 12 January 2008.

=== Ties ===
Tie	Home team	Score	Away team	Attendance
1	Vauxhall Motors	1 – 4	Burton Albion	551
2	Woking	2 – 4	Aldershot Town	2,368
3	Tonbridge Angels	0 – 4	AFC Wimbledon	2,281
4	Droylsden	1 – 0	Cambridge City	377
5	Weymouth	0 – 0	Kidderminster Harriers	831
6	Farsley Celtic	1 – 1	Alfreton Town	370
7	Rushden & Diamonds	3 – 0	Exeter City	1,098
8	Dorchester Town	0 – 2	Ebbsfleet United	418
9	Histon	2 – 0	Cambridge United	1,920
10	Braintree Town	1 – 1	Workington	506
11	Bishop's Stortford	2 – 2	Halifax Town	731
12	Newport County	1 – 2	Torquay United	1,510
13	Stafford Rangers	2 – 1	Forest Green Rovers	627
14	Crawley Town	2 – 1	Eastleigh	808
15	York City	1 – 1	Grays Athletic	1,351
16	Blyth Spartans	0 – 1	Tamworth	574

=== Replays ===
Tie	Home team	Score	Away team	Attendance
5	Kidderminster Harriers	2 – 2	Weymouth	994
	Weymouth won 3–0 on penalties			
6	Alfreton Town	0 – 2	Farsley Celtic	268
10	Workington	1 – 2	Braintree Town	421
11	Halifax Town	4 – 1	Bishop's Stortford	728
15	Grays Athletic	1 – 4	York City	528

== Third round ==
- The draw was made on 14 January 2008.
- Ties will be played on 2 February 2008.

=== Ties ===
Tie	Home team	Score	Away team	Attendance
1	Ebbsfleet United	1 – 0	Weymouth	818
2	Burton Albion	1 – 1	Histon	1,769
3	Aldershot Town	3 – 0	Braintree Town	1,772
4	Farsley Celtic	0 – 2	York City	952
5	Stafford Rangers	2 – 2	Tamworth	1,025
6	Crawley Town	8 – 0	Droylsden	937
7	AFC Wimbledon	0 – 2	Torquay United	4,085
8	Halifax Town	0 – 2	Rushden & Diamonds	1,384

=== Ties ===
Tie	Home team	Score	Away team	Attendance
2	Histon	0 – 1	Burton Albion	564
5	Tamworth	2 – 1	Stafford Rangers	571

== Fourth round ==
- The draw was made on 4 February 2008.
- Ties will be played on 23 February 2008.
2008-02-23
15:00

Tamworth	1–2	Aldershot Town
Sheridan 82'	(Report)	Winfield 81'; Hudson 90'

The Lamb Ground, Tamworth
Attendance: 1,204
Referee: David Richard

2008-02-23
15:00

Rushden & Diamonds	0–1	York City
	(Report)	Parslow 14'

Nene Park, Irthlingborough
Attendance: 1,626
Referee: N Kinseley (Essex)

2008-02-23
15:00

Torquay United	4–1	Crawley Town
D'Sane 19'; Mohamed 59'; Mohamed 66'; Phillips 66'	(Report)	Cook (pen) 87'

Plainmoor, Torquay
Attendance: 2,301
Referee: James Linnington (Newport, Isle of Wight)

2008-02-23
15:00

Burton Albion	0–0	Ebbsfleet United
	(Report)

Pirelli Stadium, Burton upon Trent
Attendance: 2,103
Referee: Chris Pawson (Sheffield)

=== Replays ===
2008-02-25
19:45

Ebbsfleet United	1 – 0 (a.e.t.)	Burton Albion
Long 116'	(Report)

Stonebridge Road, Northfleet
Attendance: 841
Referee: James Linnington (Newport, Isle of Wight)

== Semi-finals ==
- The draw was made on 25 February 2008.
- The two-legged ties will be played on 8 March and 15 March 2008.

=== First legs ===
7 March 2008
19:45

Torquay United	2–0	York City
Sills 5'; Phillips 46'	(Report)

Plainmoor, Torquay
Attendance: 2,286

8 March 2008
12:00

Ebbsfleet United	3–1	Aldershot Town
McPhee 6'; McPhee 37'; McCarthy 78'	(Report)	Mendes 76'

Stonebridge Road, Northfleet
Attendance: 2,483

=== Second legs ===
15 March 2008
15:00

Aldershot Town	1–1	Ebbsfleet United
Mendes 61'	(Report)	Bostwick 90'

Recreation Ground, Aldershot
Attendance: 4,344

Ebbsfleet United win 4–2 on aggregate

15 March 2008
15:00

York City	1–0	Torquay United
Todd 64' (o.g.)	(Report)

Bootham Crescent, York
Attendance: 3,625

Torquay United win 2–1 on aggregate

== Final ==
2008-05-10
14:30

Ebbsfleet United	1–0	Torquay United
McPhee 45'	(Report)

Wembley Stadium, London
Attendance: 40,186
Referee: Martin Atkinson

The Starting Teams were:

Torquay United; 21 Martin Rice, 3 Kevin Nicholson, 4 Steve Woods (c), 6 Chris Todd, 7 Lee Mansell, 8 Tim Sills, (11 Kevin Hill 89mins) 10 Lee Phillips (19 Danny Stevens 46mins) 14 Chris Hargreaves, 20 Roscoe D'Sane (9 Elliot Benyon 66mins) 24 Steve Adams, 26 Chris Zebroski. Subs Not Used 5 Chris Robertson, 16 Matt Hockley.

Ebbsfleet United; 1 Lance Cronin, 2 Peter Hawkins, 3 Sacha Opinel, 5 James Smith, 6 Paul McCarthy (c), 8 Stacy Long (4 Gary McDonald 84mins) 12 Chris McPhee, 14 Neil Barrett, 18 Luke Moore, 19 John Akinde, 25 Micheal Bostwick. Substitutes 21 Sam Mott, 10 Chukki Erribenne, 15 Mark Ricketts, 17 George Purcell.
