= 2007–08 Gretna F.C. season =

Gretna
2007–08 season
- Chairman: Brooks Mileson
- Manager: Davie Irons (until February); Mick Wadsworth (from February)
- Scottish Premier League: 12th place (relegated)
- Scottish Cup: Fourth round
- Scottish League Cup: Third round
- Highest home attendance: 6,137 vs. Rangers, 16 January 2008
- Lowest home attendance: 342 vs. Cowdenbeath, 28 August 2007

The 2007–08 season was the sixth and final season for Gretna in the Scottish Football League (SFL), and Gretna's only season in the Scottish Premier League (SPL). The club dissolved at the end of the season.

== Players ==
=== Gretna's final squad ===
The squad given here is made up of the players registered to the club on the date of Gretna F.C.'s final league match (Gretna 1–0 Hearts, 14 May 2008).

Note: Flags indicate national team as defined under FIFA eligibility rules; some limited exceptions apply. Players may hold more than one non-FIFA nationality.

No.	Pos.	Nation	Player
2	DF	(Scotland) SCO	Craig Barr
7	MF	(England) ENG	Ryan Baldacchino
11	MF	(England) ENG	Gavin Skelton
12	MF	(Republic of Ireland) IRL	Brendan McGill
17	MF	(England) ENG	Steven Hogg
20	MF	(England) ENG	Nicky Deverdics
24	GK	(Scotland) SCO	Greg Fleming
26	MF	(England) ENG	Paul Murray (captain)
27	MF	(Ghana) GHA	Abdul Osman
34	MF	(England) ENG	Dan Robinson

No.	Pos.	Nation	Player
36	DF	(England) ENG	Danny Hall
37	DF	(England) ENG	Kyle Naughton (on loan from Sheffield United)
38	MF	(England) ENG	John Paul Kissock (on loan from Everton)
39	MF	(England) ENG	Ben Wilkinson (on loan from Hull City)
40	GK	(Poland) POL	Artur Krysiak (on loan from Birmingham City)
41	DF	(England) ENG	Rhys Meynell (on loan from Barnsley)
43	DF	(Sweden) SWE	Erik Schultz-Eklund
45	MF	(England) ENG	Nathan Fisher
46	FW	(England) ENG	Nathan Taylor
47	DF	(England) ENG	Jack Sharples

=== Left club during season ===
Note: Flags indicate national team as defined under FIFA eligibility rules; some limited exceptions apply. Players may hold more than one non-FIFA nationality.

No.	Pos.	Nation	Player
1	GK	(Scotland) SCO	Colin Scott (released)
3	DF	(England) ENG	Danny Grainger (to Dundee United)
4	DF	(England) ENG	David Cowan (to Dundee)
5	DF	(Scotland) SCO	Martin Canning (to Hibernian)
7	MF	(England) ENG	Ryan Baldacchino (to Altona Magic)
8	FW	(Scotland) SCO	James Grady (to Hamilton Academical)
9	FW	(Scotland) SCO	Colin McMenamin (to Dundee)
10	MF	(Scotland) SCO	David Graham (to Hamilton Academical)
14	FW	(Scotland) SCO	Kenny Deuchar (to Real Salt Lake)
15	MF	(Scotland) SCO	Allan Jenkins (to Greenock Morton)
16	DF	(Scotland) SCO	Ryan McGuffie (to Greenock Morton)
18	MF	(Australia) AUS	Eric Paartalu (made redundant; to Greenock Morton)
19	MF	(Scotland) SCO	Fraser McLaren (on loan to Montrose)

No.	Pos.	Nation	Player
21	DF	(Scotland) SCO	Chris Innes (made redundant)
22	DF	(England) ENG	Michael Tait (on loan to Newcastle Blue Star; made redundant)
23	MF	(Northern Ireland) NIR	Niall Henderson (to Raith Rovers)
25	GK	(Scotland) SCO	David Mathieson (made redundant)
28	MF	(Uruguay) URU	Fabián Yantorno (released)
29	DF	(France) FRA	Aurélien Collin (made redundant)
30	FW	(France) FRA	Mickaël Buscher (made redundant)
31	DF	(England) ENG	Evan Horwood (on loan from Sheffield United)
32	DF	(Scotland) SCO	Nicholas Faulds (made redundant)
33	GK	(England) ENG	Tony Caig (to Houston Dynamo)
35	FW	(Nigeria) NGA	Henry Makinwa (made redundant)
44	GK	(England) ENG	Conor Grant (made redundant)

=== Youth team ===
Note: Flags indicate national team as defined under FIFA eligibility rules; some limited exceptions apply. Players may hold more than one non-FIFA nationality.

No.	Pos.	Nation	Player
—	DF	(England) ENG	Dan Ewing
—	DF	(England) ENG	Andrew Johnson
—	MF	(England) ENG	Alex Redfern (made redundant)
—	FW	(Scotland) SCO	Liam Cusack (made redundant)
—	FW	(Scotland) SCO	Ryan O'Hara (made redundant)
—	FW	(England) ENG	Joe Hughes (made redundant)
—		(Scotland) SCO	Callum McKinlay (made redundant)

No.	Pos.	Nation	Player
—		(England) ENG	Jake Cunningham (made redundant)
—	MF		Mario Campagna (made redundant)
—			Grant Easton (made redundant)
—			Christopher Moffet (made redundant)
—			Jack Pattison (made redundant)
—			Daniel Smee (made redundant)

== Competitions ==
=== Scottish Premier League ===
Match Day	Date	Opponent	H/A	Score	Gretna Scorers	Attendance
1	4 August	Falkirk	H	0–4		2,731
2	11 August	Hibernian	A	2–4	Yantorno, McMenamin	13,594
3	18 August	Heart of Midlothian	A	1–1	Barr	16,407
4	25 August	Motherwell	H	1–2	Osman	3,758
5	1 September	Rangers	A	0–4		49,689
6	15 September	Kilmarnock	H	1–2	Skelton	1,516
7	22 September	Dundee United	H	3–2	Cowan (2), Jenkins	1,624
8	29 September	Aberdeen	A	0–2		10,279
9	7 October	Celtic	H	1–2	Yantorno	6,011
10	20 October	St Mirren	A	0–1		3,646
11	27 October	Inverness Caledonian Thistle	H	0–4		1,096
12	3 November	Falkirk	A	0–2		4,843
13	10 November	Hibernian	H	0–1		2,666
14	25 November	Heart of Midlothian	H	1–1	Kingston (og)	1,544
15	1 December	Motherwell	A	0–3		6,431
16	15 December	Kilmarnock	A	3–3	Skelton, Grainger (pen), Horwood	5,122
17	22 December	Dundee United	A	2–1	Deuchar, Deverdics	6,304
18	26 December	Aberdeen	H	1–1	Jenkins	1,730
19	29 December	Celtic	A	0–3		57,171
20	5 January	Inverness Caledonian Thistle	A	0–3		3,919
21	16 January	Rangers	H	1–2	Deuchar	6,137
22	19 January	Falkirk	H	2–0	Deuchar, Murray	1,609
23	9 February	Heart of Midlothian	A	0–2		16,138
24	13 February	Hibernian	A	2–4	Skelton, Deuchar	12,087
25	16 February	Motherwell	H	1–3	McGill	2,877
26	24 February	Rangers	A	2–4	Deuchar (2)	48,375
27	27 February	Kilmarnock	H	4–2	Deverdics, Meynell, Barr, Buscher	1,545
28	6 March	Dundee United	H	0–3		501
29	15 March	Aberdeen	A	0–3		9,025
30	23 March	Celtic	H	0–3		3,561
31	29 March	St Mirren	A	0–2		3,577
32	5 April	Inverness Caledonian Thistle	H	1–2	Barr	431
33	9 April	St Mirren	H	0–0		751
34	19 April	Falkirk	A	0–0		4,490
35	26 April	Kilmarnock	A	1–1	Barr	4,086
36	3 May	Inverness Caledonian Thistle	A	1–6	Hogg	3,639
37	10 May	St Mirren	A	0–0		3,163
38	13 May	Heart of Midlothian	H	1–0	Skelton	1,090

=== Scottish League Cup ===
Round	Date	Opponent	H/A	Score	Gretna Scorer(s)	Attendance
Second round	28 August	Cowdenbeath	H	3–1	Barr, Yantorno, Jenkins	342
Third round	25 September	Inverness Caledonian Thistle	A	0–3		1,717

=== Scottish Cup ===
Round	Date	Opponent	H/A	Score	Gretna Scorer(s)	Attendance
Fourth round	12 January	Greenock Morton	A	2–2	Yantorno, Horwood	2,848
Fourth round replay	28 January	Greenock Morton	H	0–3		1,167

== League table ==
Pos	Team	Pld	W	D	L	GF	GA	GD	Pts	Qualification or relegation (Note: Teams played each other three times (33 matches), before the league split into two groups (the top six and the bottom six) for the last five matches.)
8	Heart of Midlothian	38	13	9	16	47	55	−8	48	
9	Inverness Caledonian Thistle	38	13	4	21	51	62	−11	43	
10	St Mirren	38	10	11	17	26	54	−28	41	
11	Kilmarnock	38	10	10	18	39	52	−13	40	
12	Gretna (R)	38	5	8	25	32	83	−51	13 (Note: Gretna were deducted 10 points for entering administration.)	Resigned from the Scottish Football League and liquidated (Note: At the end of the season, Gretna were relegated to the Third Division due to their financial struggles. However, as no buyer was found for the club, they resigned from the Scottish Football League and were subsequently liquidated.)

Source: Scottish Professional Football League
Rules for classification: 1) Points; 2) Goal difference; 3) Goals scored
(R) Relegated
