= 2008–09 York City F.C. season =

Association football club season

York City F.C.
2008–09 season
- Chairman: Jason McGill
- Manager: Colin Walker (until 21 November 2008); Neil Redfearn (caretaker, from 21 November 2008 until 24 November 2008); Martin Foyle (from 24 November 2008)
- Ground: Bootham Crescent
- Conference Premier: 17th
- FA Cup: Fourth qualifying round (eliminated by Mansfield Town)
- FA Trophy: Runners-up (eliminated by Stevenage Borough)
- Conference League Cup: Northern section fourth round (eliminated by Barrow)
- Top goalscorer: League: Richard Brodie (15); All: Richard Brodie (19)
- Highest home attendance: 3,512 vs AFC Telford United, FA Trophy, 21 March 2009
- Lowest home attendance: 608 vs Mansfield Town, Conference League Cup, 4 November 2008
- Average home league attendance: 2,295
Home colours	Away colours	Third colours

The 2008–09 season was the 87th season of competitive association football and fifth season in the Football Conference played by York City Football Club, a professional football club based in York, North Yorkshire, England. Their 14th-place finish in 2007–08 meant it was their fifth successive season in the Conference Premier. The season covers the period from 1 July 2008 to 30 June 2009.

Ahead of Colin Walker's first start to a season as manager, York signed nine players before the summer transfer window closed. The season started with an eight-match unbeaten run, but Walker was dismissed in November 2008 after three successive defeats. Martin Foyle was appointed as his successor, and after the turn of the year York won only five league matches. Survival in the Conference Premier was achieved with a 17th-place finish. York reached the 2009 FA Trophy final at Wembley Stadium, being beaten 2–0 by Stevenage Borough. They were eliminated from the 2008–09 FA Cup in the fourth qualifying round, and from the 2008–09 Conference League Cup in the Northern section fourth round.

33 players made at least one appearance in nationally organised first-team competition, and there were 14 different goalscorers. Defender Daniel Parslow missed only one of the 58 competitive matches played over the season. Richard Brodie finished as leading scorer with 19 goals, of which 15 came in league competition and four came in the FA Trophy. The winner of the Clubman of the Year award, voted for by the club's supporters, was Parslow.

== Background and pre-season ==
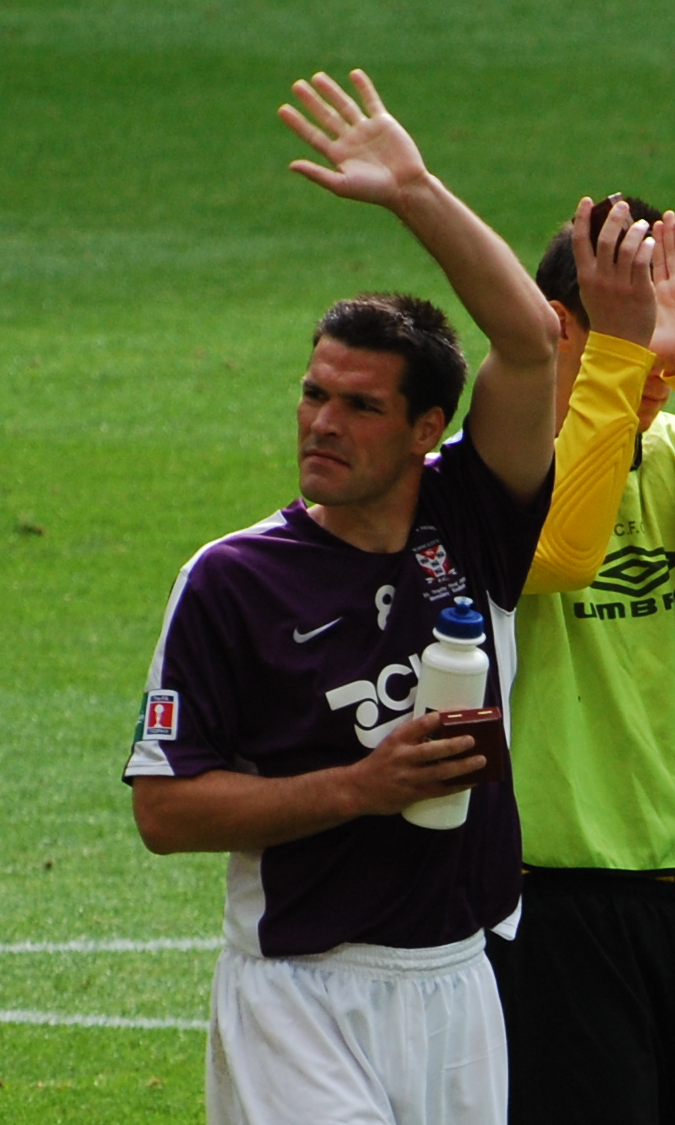
Mark Greaves was appointed club captain after signing from Burton Albion.

Billy McEwan was dismissed as manager of York City early into the 2007–08 season, with the team 19th in the Conference Premier table and having recently been beaten by Conference South team Havant & Waterlooville in the FA Cup. After a six-match unbeaten run as caretaker manager, Colin Walker was appointed as York's permanent manager and led the team to a 14th-place finish in the table. York released Darren Craddock, Stuart Elliott, Tom Evans, Ross Greenwood, Anthony Lloyd, Manny Panther and Alex Rhodes after the season ended, while Nicky Wroe and Martyn Woolford left for Torquay United and Scunthorpe United respectively.

Jimmy Beadle, Richard Brodie, Craig Farrell, Josh Mimms, Daniel Parslow, Ben Purkiss, Mark Robinson and Onome Sodje signed new contracts ahead of 2008–09. York signed seven players before the season started; they were goalkeepers Michael Ingham from Hereford United and Artur Krysiak on a one-month loan from Birmingham City, defender Mark Greaves from Burton Albion, midfielders Niall Henderson from Raith Rovers, Steven Hogg from Gretna and Ben Wilkinson from Hull City, and striker Daniel McBreen from St Johnstone. Professional contracts were handed to three youth-team players, those being defenders Andy McWilliams and Josh Radcliffe and winger Liam Shepherd. Greaves was named as York's club captain for the season.

New home and away kits were introduced for the first time in two years. The home kit comprised red and navy blue halved shirts with red collars, navy blue shorts and navy blue socks with two white strips on the cuffs. The away kit included white shirts with black shoulders, white shorts and white socks with black cuffs. Last season's third kit was retained, which featured light blue shirts with a maroon collar, bar a section under the neck which was light blue, and maroon trims on the sleeves, maroon shorts and light blue socks. CLP Industries continued as shirt sponsors for the fourth successive season.

Pre-season match details
Date	Opponents	Venue	Result	Score F–A	Scorers	Attendance	Ref.
8 July 2008	Tadcaster Albion	A	W	6–0	Brown (Note: Trialist) (2), Farrell (2), Brodie, Woolford	450	
11 July 2008	Leeds United	H	D	1–1	Sodje 43'	4,405	
18 July 2008	Middlesbrough	H	D	2–2	Boyes 73', Sodje 86'	3,177	
22 July 2008	Barnsley	H	D	2–2	Farrell (2)	1,145	
25 July 2008	Harrogate Railway Athletic	A	W	2–1	Shepherd 35', Brodie 41'		
30 July 2008	Hartlepool United	H	W	1–0	Wilkinson 40'		
3 August 2008	Sheffield	A	W	1–0	McGurk 89'		

== Review ==
=== August ===
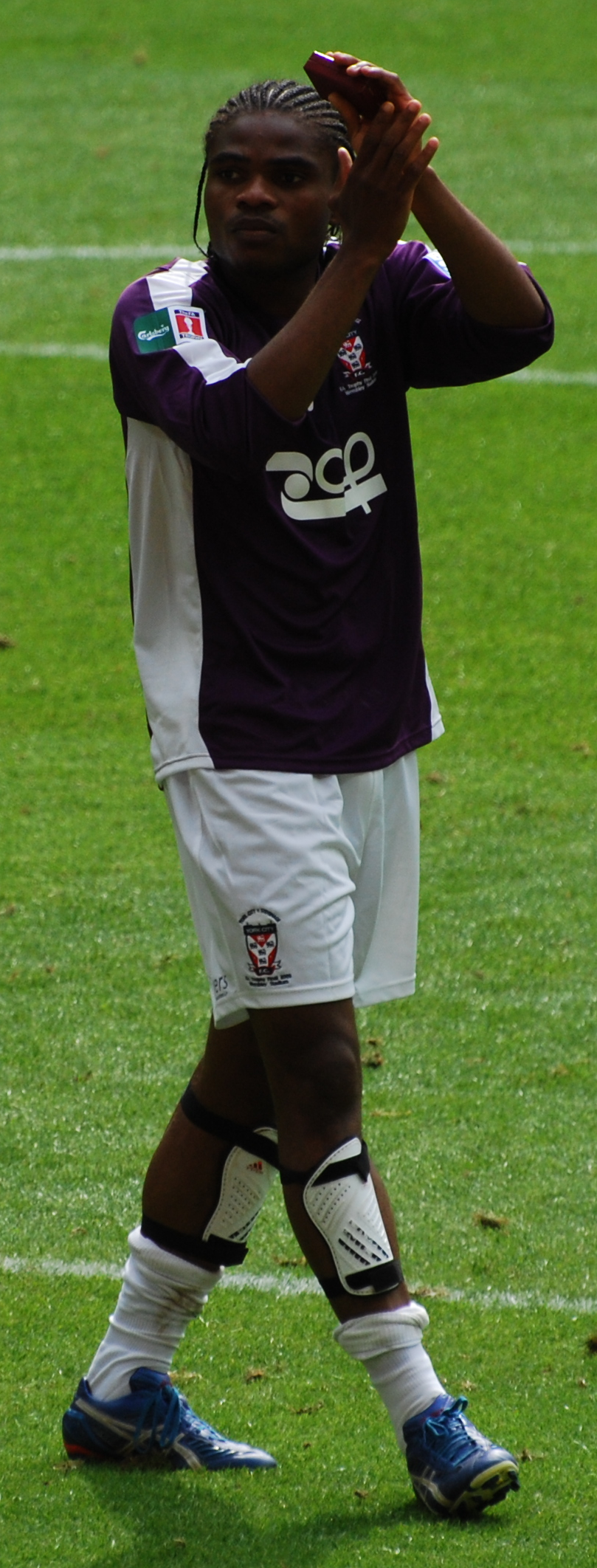
Onome Sodje's goal against Torquay United won him the Conference Premier Goal of the Month competition.

York's season started with a 1–0 victory away to Crawley Town, Farrell scoring the winner 19 minutes from time. The second match was a 1–0 home win over Wrexham, who had won their opening fixture 5–0 against Stevenage Borough, with Greaves scoring the winner. Krysiak suffered a dislocated finger during this match, which resulted in him returning to Birmingham prematurely from his loan spell, and was replaced by Mimms, who gave an assured performance. York's winning start to the season ended after a 1–1 home draw with Histon, who took the lead through a Daniel Wright penalty kick in the first half, before McBreen scored the equaliser for York on 69 minutes.

Winger Simon Russell signed for the club from Kidderminster Harriers. York drew 2–2 away to Northwich Victoria, which saw the team fight back on two occasions after twice being a goal down, with Brodie scoring his first goal of the season. He then scored in the third minute against Barrow, who equalised seven minutes later through Lee Hunt, in a home match that finished a 1–1 home draw. Beadle was loaned out to Northern Premier League Premier Division club Whitby Town for a month, having not made any appearances in 2008–09. Sodje scored with a late volley after coming off the bench to give York a 1–1 draw away to Torquay United to maintain the team's unbeaten record, which looked under threat after Danny Stevens gave Torquay the lead on 65 minutes. Sodje's goal against Torquay won the first Conference Premier Goal of the Month competition, for August 2008.

=== September ===
Grimsby Town midfielder Peter Bore joined on an initial one-month loan on transfer deadline day. York drew for the fifth time in succession with a 1–1 home draw with Mansfield Town, in which Sodje scored after he latched onto Adie Moses' misplaced header. The team's first victory in six matches came in a 2–0 home win over Woking; the goals came from McBreen and a Danny Bunce own goal. A 4–2 defeat away to Kettering Town saw York's unbeaten run come to an end after nine matches, leaving their opponents as the only unbeaten team in the division. Former Accrington Stanley striker David Brown, former Rotherham United defender Tom Hirst and Ipswich Town midfielder Jai Reason joined the club on trial. After impressing in a reserve-team match, Hirst was signed by the club. However, Brown and Reason were not offered contracts.

An 86th-minute equaliser from McBreen gave York a 1–1 draw at home to Salisbury City, which maintained the team's unbeaten record at Bootham Crescent. Parslow signed a new contract with the club, and Rotherham midfielder Peter Holmes joined on a one-month loan. A second defeat of the season came after losing 2–0 away to Kidderminster, Brian Smikle and Justin Richards scoring for the home team. Beadle was released by the club towards the end of his loan spell at Whitby, due to him looking for regular first-team football. This was followed by the departure of Bore, who returned to Grimsby from his loan spell early. A 3–3 draw away against Stevenage was achieved after the team were 2–0 down after 19 minutes, with the York goals coming from Sodje, Holmes and Farrell. Sodje picked up a hamstring injury during this match, meaning he would be out of action for four to six weeks.

=== October ===
Despite having the better chances, York drew 0–0 at home with Cambridge United, before being beaten 3–1 away by Wrexham, in which Wilkinson scored a late consolation goal. The club made an attempt to re-sign former striker Clayton Donaldson on loan from Crewe Alexandra, but were told to make an inquiry four weeks later, due to him being injured. York's first double of the season came with a 2–0 away win over Woking, the goals coming from Wilkinson and McBreen. Iyseden Christie's loan spell at Kettering from Stevenage was to be terminated for a loan move to York to go ahead, but this deal fell through. Walker revealed he was interested in signing striker Bruce Dyer, shortly after he played against York's reserve team for Bradford City.

York achieved a consecutive victory for the first time in 2008–09 after beating Rushden & Diamonds 2–0 at home, with goals from Robinson and Farrell. After this match, Holmes was recalled by Rotherham. Brodie was loaned to fellow Conference Premier club Barrow for one month, having lost his place in the starting line-up. Former Leeds United midfielder Gavin Rothery impressed for the reserve team against Hartlepool United, after which he signed a short-term contract with the club. A 0–0 home draw with Mansfield in the fourth qualifying round of the FA Cup resulted in a replay, which would be played at Field Mill. Radcliffe was sent out on loan for a month at Harrogate Railway Athletic of the Northern Premier League Division One North. York were eliminated from the FA Cup after a 1–0 defeat away to Mansfield.

=== November ===
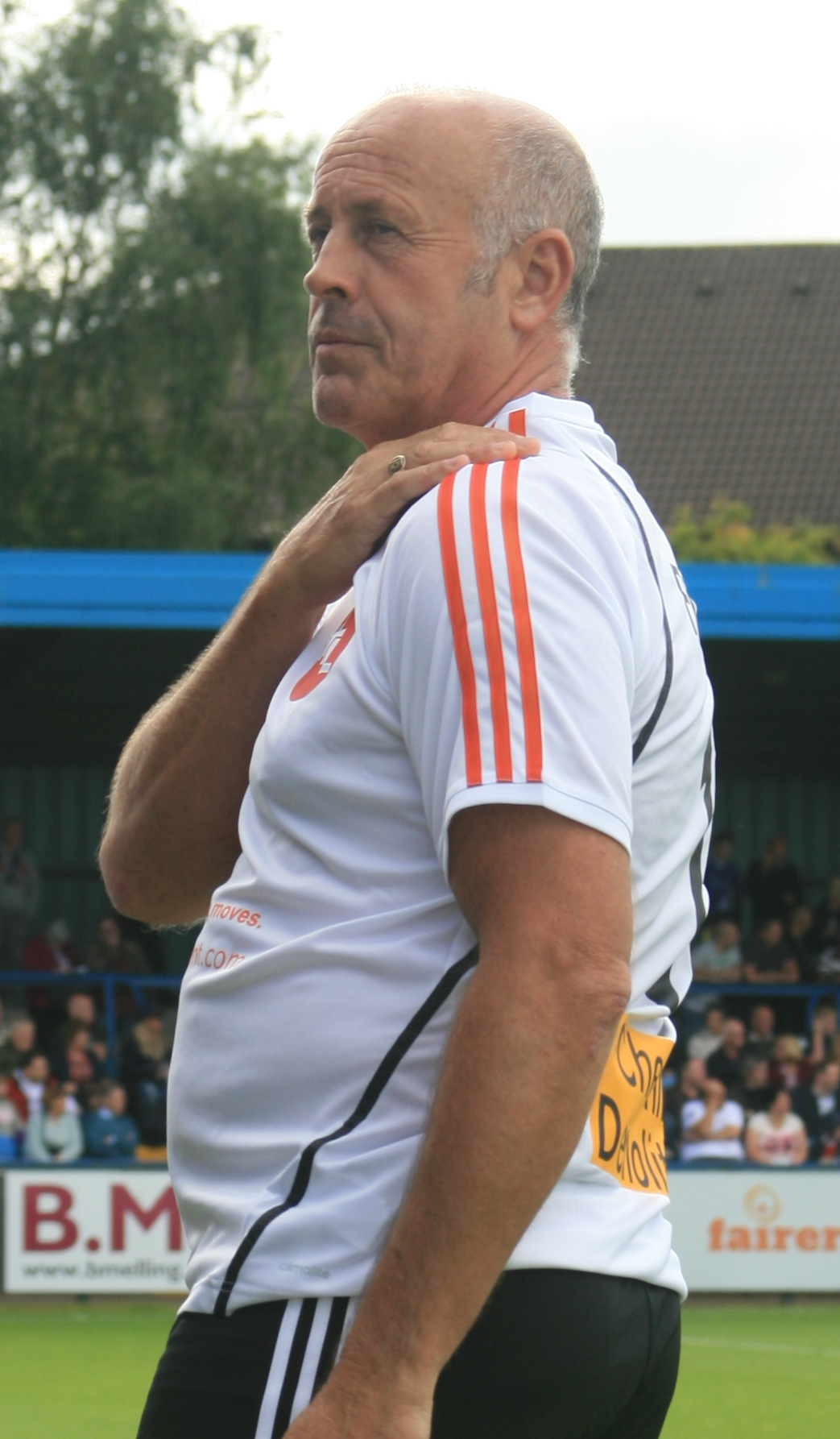
Martin Foyle was appointed manager following Colin Walker's dismissal.

An 87th-minute penalty scored by Yemi Odubade saw York lose 1–0 away to Oxford United. Dyer signed for the club, having been unattached after his release by Chesterfield at the end of 2007–08. Adam Boyes signed a long-term professional contract ahead of York's Conference League Cup third round tie against Mansfield, which was won with a 4–2 penalty shoot-out victory. This was preceded by Greaves' headed goal in the fourth minute of stoppage time, earning the team a 1–1 draw, which was followed by a goalless period of extra time. The attendance of 609 was the lowest crowd in the club history—breaking the previous record of 763 set in the 2007–08 Conference League Cup.

York lost 2–1 at home to Torquay, in their first home defeat of the season. After Roscoe Dsane gave the visitors the lead, Greaves equalised for York with a header from a Purkiss cross in the 85th minute, before Mark Ellis scored for Torquay on 90 minutes. A third successive defeat came after losing 1–0 away to Cambridge. It was agreed that Brodie's loan at Barrow would be extended after he scored four goals in six appearances, but York decided to overturn this decision a day later. Barrow hoped to open talks over signing him on a permanent contract in January 2009.

Walker was dismissed as manager, alongside head coach Eric Winstanley, with youth-team coach Neil Redfearn taking over as caretaker manager. He took charge of the team for the home match against Crawley, which finished a 2–2 draw after Lewis Killeen scored the rebound from a Thomas Pinault penalty in the 90th minute. Former Port Vale manager Martin Foyle was appointed as manager, with Redfearn taking the role of assistant manager. Foyle made his first signing by bringing in winger Adam Smith on loan from Conference North club Gainsborough Trinity. Foyle's first match in charge was a 1–1 away draw against Salisbury City, which was earned following a Brodie goal in the 83rd minute.

=== December ===
A 1–0 home defeat by Grays Athletic through a Wes Thomas goal followed; this was Grays' first away victory of the season. York followed this with a 1–1 draw away to Histon, in which they took the lead through Brodie in the 14th minute, before Parslow scored an own goal on 59 minutes. North Ferriby United striker Steve Torpey was appointed as youth-team coach to succeed Redfearn. Foyle's first win as manager came in a 2–0 away victory over Northwich Victoria in the FA Trophy first round, both goals coming from Brodie. This was followed with a 3–1 home win over Ebbsfleet United, with goals from Adam Smith, Brodie and Sodje after being one goal down. Dyer retired from football, having only made three appearances for York through back and hamstring injuries, while Rothery was released. York's two-match winning run ended after a 2–1 defeat away to league-leaders Burton Albion, which was secured after Greaves scored an own goal. A 2–1 home defeat by Altrincham followed; Brodie scored a free kick in the 32nd minute to give York the lead, before Chris Senior and Dale Johnson scored for the visitors in the second half. Redfearn left the club to take charge of the Leeds under-18 team and Andy Porter, a former teammate of Foyle at Port Vale, was appointed as assistant manager.

=== January ===
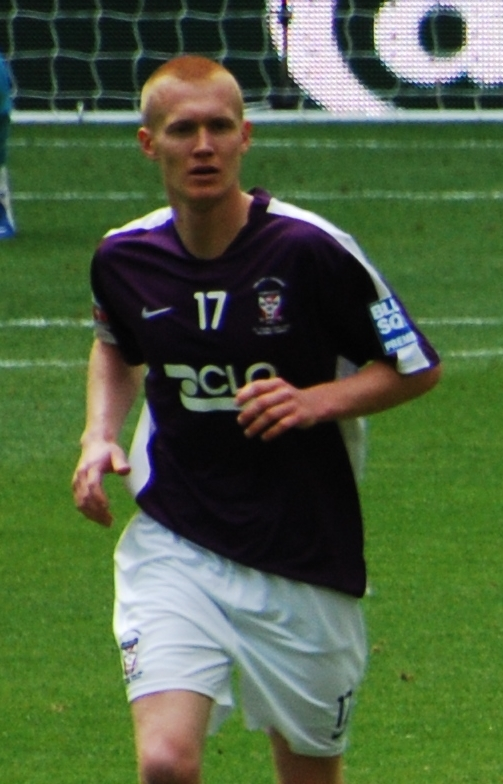
Levi Mackin joined on loan from Wrexham.

The New Year began with a second defeat of the season to Burton, this time being beaten 3–1 at home, in which Brodie scored in the first half with a shot from the edge of the penalty area. Wrexham defender Kyle Critchell was signed on a one-month loan, who Foyle knew while he was a coach at the club. Adam Smith returned to Gainsborough following the conclusion of his loan, while a permanent move had been stalled as Gainsborough were holding out for a fee. Progression to the third round of the FA Trophy was ensured with a 2–1 away victory over Oxford, with goals from McBreen and Brodie. Further signings from Wrexham took place when striker Simon Brown and midfielder Christian Smith signed on loan and permanently respectively. Hirst was released having failed to break into the first team. Lewes were beaten 3–0 at home; Brodie opened the scoring with a volley into the top corner from outside the penalty area, and Christian Smith scored from 30 yards before Brodie finished the scoring with a low shot into the bottom corner. Henderson was released having fallen out of the reckoning for a first-team place.

York were knocked out of the Conference League Cup following a 3–1 away defeat by Barrow in the Northern section fourth round. Midfielder Levi Mackin was signed on loan from Wrexham until the end of the season. He debuted in York's 2–1 away defeat to Eastbourne Borough, in which Christian Smith scored a header from Brown's cross. Adam Smith rejoined York from Gainsborough on a permanent contract for an undisclosed fee. His return came as a substitute in York's 1–1 draw away to Altrincham, in which Brodie scored the equalising goal after Shaun Densmore put the home team in the lead. Farrell was loaned out to Oxford for the remainder of the season, as he sought more game time. York drew 1–1 away with Kidderminster in the FA Trophy third round, in which Boyes scored his first goal for York, meaning a replay was to be played.

=== February ===
Critchell's loan at York was extended for a second month, with the fitness of several York defenders in doubt. York were beaten 1–0 away by Mansfield, courtesy of a Robert Duffy penalty, in the teams' fourth encounter of the season. A 13–12 penalty shoot-out victory over Kidderminster followed a 1–1 extra time draw in an FA Trophy replay; in normal time, McBreen scored a header from a corner delivered by Simon Rusk before the away team equalised shortly after through Justin Richards. A new record for the most consecutive penalties scored in a shoot-out was set, at 25. McBreen was reported to have signed for North Queensland Fury of the A-League, although the transfer had yet to be confirmed by York. It was confirmed that he would join the Fury for the start of 2009–10 in August 2009. Former Wrexham defender Shaun Pejic signed after a successful trial at the club. York beat Conference South team Havant & Waterlooville 2–0 at home in the fourth round of the FA Trophy to secure a place in the semi-final, with both goals scored by McBreen. This was followed by a 2–0 away defeat to Rushden in the league. York's first league victory in a month was a 2–0 home win over Weymouth, who were forced to play a weakened team due to their financial situation, and Brodie scored headers in each half.

=== March ===
Ingham made several important saves as York drew 0–0 away to Ebbsfleet. The first leg of the FA Trophy semi-final tie against AFC Telford United ended in a 2–0 away win, with goals in each half from Rusk and Purkiss. A late goal from Sodje with a shot from the edge of the penalty area earned the team a 1–1 draw away to Forest Green Rovers, after Kaid Mohamed had given the home team a first-half lead. A 2–1 home win over Telford in the second leg of the FA Trophy semi-final, with goals in each half from Brodie and McBreen, saw York progress into 2009 FA Trophy final at Wembley Stadium with 4–1 aggregate victory. This was followed by a 0–0 home draw with Kettering in the league. Wilkinson joined divisional rivals Altrincham on loan until the end of the season, having failed to feature in the team since January 2009. York drew 0–0 with play-off contenders Kidderminster at home, which was followed by a 2–0 home defeat to Stevenage.

=== April and May ===
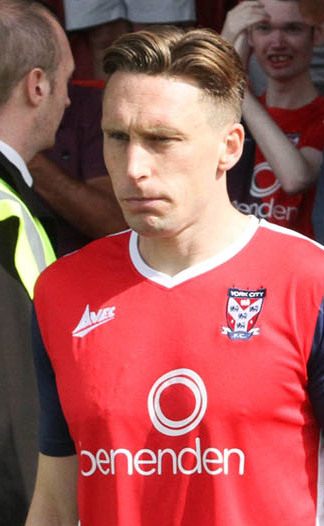
Daniel Parslow was voted Clubman of the Year.

York dropped into the relegation zone after a 1–0 away defeat to Grays, who themselves moved out of the relegation zone and above York, and this was followed with a 0–0 home draw with Oxford. They were beaten 2–1 at home by Northwich; Jonny Allan gave the visitors the lead in the first half and Robinson equalised with a penalty on 68 minutes, before Allan scored a stoppage-time winner for Northwich. This was followed by a 0–0 draw away to fellow strugglers Barrow. Before York's penultimate home match against Eastbourne, Parslow was named the 2008–09 Clubman of the Year, voted for by the club's supporters. A 1–0 victory saw York move out of the relegation zone, in what was their first league win in 10 matches. It was achieved after McBreen scored from a Purkiss pass in the 35th minute. A second successive win came at home to Forest Green, who York beat 2–1 with second-half goals from Boyes and Brodie.

A 2–1 away victory over Weymouth saw York secure survival from relegation, with their opponents facing relegation as a result. Brodie gave York a 14th-minute lead, and after Cliff Akurang equalised for Weymouth late in the first half, Boyes scored the winning goal 13 minutes from time. York's last league match was a 1–1 away draw with bottom placed Lewes, Greaves scoring on 80 minutes before the home team equalised three minutes from time. This result saw them finish the season 17th the table. York were defeated 2–0 by Stevenage in the 2009 FA Trophy final at Wembley, who scored with second-half goals from Steve Morison and Lee Boylan.

== Summary and aftermath ==
York were in a midtable position for most of the season, and were as high as fifth in August 2008, while dropping as low as 22nd in April 2009. Their goalscoring record of 47 goals scored was the fifth lowest in the division; whereas, their defensive record of 51 goals conceded was better than that of the champions Burton. Parslow made the highest number of appearances during the season, appearing in 57 of York's 58 matches. Brodie was York's top scorer in the league and in all competitions, with 15 league goals and 19 in total. McBreen was the only other player to reach double figures, with 10 goals.

After the season ended, York released Greaves, Hogg, McBreen, Pejic, Radcliffe, Robinson, Rusk, Shepherd, Christian Smith and Wilkinson. Boyes, Farrell, Darren Kelly and Sodje left for Scunthorpe, Rushden, Portadown and Barnsley respectively. Brodie, McWilliams, Mimms and Purkiss signed new contracts with the club. Over the summer York signed defenders James Meredith from Shrewsbury Town, Alan O'Hare from Mansfield and Djoumin Sangaré from Salisbury, midfielders Neil Barrett from Ebbsfleet, Andy Ferrell from Kidderminster, Alex Lawless from Forest Green, Mackin from Wrexham, winger Craig Nelthorpe from Oxford, and strikers Michael Gash from Ebbsfleet, Richard Pacquette from Maidenhead United and Michael Rankine from Rushden. Striker Michael Emmerson was promoted from the youth team after he signed a professional contract with the club.

== Match details ==
=== Conference Premier ===
Conference Premier match details
Date	League position	Opponents	Venue	Result	Score F–A	Scorers	Attendance	Ref.
9 August 2008	5th	Crawley Town	A	W	1–0	Farrell 71'	1,372	
14 August 2008	5th	Wrexham	H	W	1–0	Greaves 74'	2,603	
16 August 2008	5th	Histon	H	D	1–1	McBreen 69'	2,125	
23 August 2008	6th	Northwich Victoria	A	D	2–2	Brodie 26', Crowell 57' o.g.	1,065	
25 August 2008	7th	Barrow	H	D	1–1	Brodie 3'	2,664	
28 August 2008	7th	Torquay United	A	D	1–1	Sodje 87'	1,598	
2 September 2008	11th	Mansfield Town	H	D	1–1	Sodje 35'	2,520	
6 September 2008	7th	Woking	H	W	2–0	McBreen 38', Bunce 49' o.g.	2,307	
13 September 2008	11th	Kettering Town	A	L	2–4	Brodie 23', Purkiss 49'	2,017	
20 September 2008	10th	Salisbury City	H	D	1–1	McBreen 86'	2,280	
23 September 2008	12th	Kidderminster Harriers	A	L	0–2		1,481	
28 September 2008	13th	Stevenage Borough	A	D	3–3	Sodje 25', Holmes 45', Farrell 49'	1,917	
4 October 2008	15th	Cambridge United	H	D	0–0		2,608	
7 October 2008	17th	Wrexham	A	L	1–3	Wilkinson 90'	5,173	
11 October 2008	12th	Woking	A	W	2–0	Wilkinson 66', McBreen 72'	2,341	
18 October 2008	10th	Rushden & Diamonds	H	W	2–0	Robinson 18', Farrell 50'	2,313	
1 November 2008	13th	Oxford United	A	L	0–1		4,449	
15 November 2008	15th	Torquay United	H	L	1–2	Greaves 85'	2,412	
18 November 2008	15th	Cambridge United	A	L	0–1		2,914	
23 November 2008	14th	Crawley Town	H	D	2–2	Sodje (2) 7', 48'	1,935	
29 November 2008	14th	Salisbury City	A	D	1–1	Brodie 83'	986	
6 December 2008	15th	Grays Athletic	H	L	0–1		2,154	
9 December 2008	16th	Histon	A	D	1–1	Brodie 14'	901	
20 December 2008	14th	Ebbsfleet United	H	W	3–1	A. Smith 60', Brodie 67', Sodje 77'	1,997	
26 December 2008	16th	Burton Albion	A	L	1–2	A. Smith 53'	3,578	
28 December 2008	16th	Altrincham	H	L	1–2	Brodie 32'	2,389	
1 January 2009	16th	Burton Albion	H	L	1–3	Brodie 39'	2,703	
17 January 2009	16th	Lewes	H	W	3–0	Brodie (2) 56', 78', C. Smith 68'	2,073	
24 January 2009	17th	Eastbourne Borough	A	L	1–2	C. Smith 63'	1,668	
27 January 2009	17th	Altrincham	A	D	1–1	Brodie 46'	1,027	
7 February 2009	17th	Mansfield Town	A	L	0–1		2,576	
24 February 2009	18th	Rushden & Diamonds	A	L	0–2		1,020	
28 February 2009	17th	Weymouth	H	W	2–0	Brodie (2) 23', 90'	2,349	
8 March 2009	17th	Ebbsfleet United	A	D	0–0		1,244	
17 March 2009	17th	Forest Green Rovers	A	D	1–1	Sodje 86'	681	
24 March 2009	18th	Kettering Town	H	D	0–0		1,714	
28 March 2009	18th	Kidderminster Harriers	H	D	0–0		2,384	
31 March 2009	20th	Stevenage Borough	H	L	0–2		1,924	
4 April 2009	21st	Grays Athletic	A	L	0–1		720	
7 April 2009	21st	Oxford United	H	D	0–0		2,268	
11 April 2009	22nd	Northwich Victoria	H	L	1–2	Robinson 68' pen.	2,421	
13 April 2009	22nd	Barrow	A	D	0–0		2,168	
18 April 2009	20th	Eastbourne Borough	H	W	1–0	McBreen 35'	2,487	
21 April 2009	19th	Forest Green Rovers	H	W	2–1	Boyes 59', Brodie 63'	2,164	
24 April 2009	18th	Weymouth	A	W	2–1	Brodie 14', Boyes 77'	1,122	
26 April 2009	17th	Lewes	A	D	1–1	Greaves 80'	802	

=== League table (part) ===
Final Conference Premier table (part)
Pos	Club	Pld	W	D	L	F	A	GD	Pts
15th	Altrincham	46	15	11	20	49	66	−17	56
16th	Salisbury City	46	14	13	19	54	64	−10	55
17th	York City	46	11	19	16	47	51	−4	52
18th	Forest Green Rovers	46	12	16	18	70	76	−6	52
19th	Grays Athletic	46	14	10	22	44	64	−20	52
Key	Pos = League position; Pld = Matches played; W = Matches won; D = Matches drawn; L = Matches lost; F = Goals for; A = Goals against; GD = Goal difference; Pts = Points								
Source									

=== FA Cup ===
FA Cup match details
Round	Date	Opponents	Venue	Result	Score F–A	Scorers	Attendance	Ref.
Fourth qualifying round	25 October 2008	Mansfield Town	H	D	0–0		1,976	
Fourth qualifying round replay	28 October 2008	Mansfield Town	A	L	0–1		2,004	

=== FA Trophy ===
FA Trophy match details
Round	Date	Opponents	Venue	Result	Score F–A	Scorers	Attendance	Ref.
First round	16 December 2008	Northwich Victoria	A	W	2–0	Brodie (2) 20', 50'	393	
Second round	13 January 2009	Oxford United	A	W	2–1	McBreen 48', Brodie 82'	1,958	
Third round	31 January 2009	Kidderminster Harriers	A	D	1–1	Boyes 25'	1,153	
Third round replay	11 February 2009	Kidderminster Harriers	H	D	1–1 a.e.t. 13–12 pens.	McBreen 74'	683	
Fourth round	21 February 2009	Havant & Waterlooville	H	W	2–0	McBreen (2) 45', 82'	1,679	
Semi-final first leg	14 March 2009	AFC Telford United	A	W	2–0	Rusk 10', Purkiss 68'	2,792	
Semi-final second leg	21 March 2009	AFC Telford United	H	W	2–1; 4–1 agg.	Brodie 17', McBreen 62'	3,512	
Final	9 May 2009	Stevenage Borough	N	L	0–2		27,102	

=== Conference League Cup ===
Conference League Cup match details
Round	Date	Opponents	Venue	Result	Score F–A	Scorers	Attendance	Ref.
Third round	4 November 2008	Mansfield Town	H	D	1–1 a.e.t. 4–2 pens.	Greaves 90+4'	608	
Northern section fourth round	20 January 2009	Barrow	A	L	1–3	Russell 78'	596	

== Transfers ==
=== In ===
Date	Player	Club†	Fee	Ref.
14 May 2008	Mark Greaves	(Burton Albion)	Free	
14 May 2008	Michael Ingham	(Hereford United)	Free	
10 June 2008	Steven Hogg	(Gretna)	Free	
10 June 2008	Ben Wilkinson	(Hull City)	Free	
19 June 2008	Niall Henderson	(Raith Rovers)	Free	
25 June 2008	Daniel McBreen	(St Johnstone)	Free	
22 August 2008	Simon Russell	Kidderminster Harriers	Free	
19 September 2008	Tom Hirst	(Rotherham United)	Free	
24 October 2008	Gavin Rothery	(Leeds United)	Free	
3 November 2008	Bruce Dyer	(Chesterfield)	Free	
15 January 2009	Christian Smith	(Wrexham)	Free	
26 January 2009	Adam Smith	Gainsborough Trinity	Undisclosed	
20 February 2009	Shaun Pejic	(Wrexham)	Free	

† Brackets around club names denote the player's contract with that club had expired before he joined York.

=== Out ===
Date	Player	Club†	Fee	Ref.
8 August 2008	Martyn Woolford	Scunthorpe United	Undisclosed	
25 September 2008	Jimmy Beadle	(Whitby Town)	Released	
23 December 2008	Bruce Dyer		Retired	
23 December 2008	Gavin Rothery	(Harrogate Town)	Released	
16 January 2009	Tom Hirst	(Harrogate Town)	Released	
20 January 2009	Niall Henderson	(Newry City)	Released	
11 May 2009	Darren Kelly	(Portadown)	Free	
12 May 2009	Steven Hogg	(Roach Dynamos)	Released	
12 May 2009	Josh Radcliffe	(Farsley Celtic)	Released	
12 May 2009	Daniel McBreen	(North Queensland Fury)	Released	
12 May 2009	Mark Robinson	(Gateshead)	Released	
12 May 2009	Simon Rusk	(Crawley Town)	Released	
12 May 2009	Liam Shepherd	(Farsley Celtic)	Released	
12 May 2009	Christian Smith	(Wrexham)	Released	
9 June 2009	Mark Greaves	(Gainsborough Trinity)	Released	
12 June 2009	Craig Farrell	(Rushden & Diamonds)	Swap (Note: Swap deal with Michael Rankine)	
23 June 2009	Shaun Pejic	(Vancouver Whitecaps)	Released	
15 June 2009	Onome Sodje	(Barnsley)	Free	

† Brackets around club names denote the player joined that club after his York contract expired.

=== Loans in ===
Date	Player	Club	Return	Ref.
7 August 2008	Artur Krysiak	Birmingham City	Terminated early 15 August 2008	
1 September 2008	Peter Bore	Grimsby Town	Terminated early 27 September 2008	
22 September 2008	Peter Holmes	Rotherham United	Recalled 18 October 2008	
27 November 2008	Adam Smith	Gainsborough Trinity	6 January 2009	
5 January 2009	Kyle Critchell	Wrexham	Recalled early March 2009	
15 January 2009	Simon Brown	Wrexham	End of season	
22 January 2009	Levi Mackin	Wrexham	End of season	

=== Loans out ===
Date	Player	Club	Return	Ref.
27 August 2008	Jimmy Beadle	Whitby Town	Released 25 September 2008	
23 October 2008	Richard Brodie	Barrow	22 November 2008	
27 October 2008	Josh Radcliffe	Harrogate Railway Athletic	One-month	
31 January 2009	Craig Farrell	Oxford United	End of season	
26 March 2009	Ben Wilkinson	Altrincham	End of season	

== Appearances and goals ==
Numbers in parentheses denote appearances as substitute.
Players with names struck through and marked † left the club during the playing season.
Players with names in italics and marked * were on loan from another club for the whole of their season with York.
Players listed with no appearances have been in the matchday squad but only as unused substitutes.
Key to positions: GK – Goalkeeper; DF – Defender; MF – Midfielder; FW – Forward

Players included in matchday squads
No.	Pos.	Nat.	Name	League		FA Cup		FA Trophy		CL Cup		Total		Discipline	
No.	Pos.	Nat.	Name	Apps	Goals	Apps	Goals	Apps	Goals	Apps	Goals	Apps	Goals	A yellow rectangle, denoting the yellow penalty card shown to a player being cautioned	A red rectangle, denoting the red penalty card shown to a player being sent off
1	GK	POL	~~Artur Krysiak~~ * †	2	0	0	0	0	0	0	0	2	0	0	0
1	GK	ENG	Jonathan McDonald	0	0	0	0	0	0	0	0	0	0	0	0
2	DF	ENG	Ben Purkiss	38 (1)	1	2	0	5	1	1	0	46 (1)	2	0	0
3	DF	ENG	Mark Robinson	37	2	2	0	7	0	1	0	47	2	6	0
4	DF	NIR	Darren Kelly	7 (2)	0	1	0	0 (1)	0	1	0	9 (3)	0	2	0
5	DF	ENG	David McGurk	35 (2)	0	2	0	3 (2)	0	1	0	41 (4)	0	4	0
6	DF	WAL	Daniel Parslow	45	0	2	0	8	0	2	0	57	0	2	0
7	FW	NGR	Onome Sodje	17 (19)	7	0 (2)	0	1 (5)	0	2	0	20 (26)	7	0	0
8	DF	ENG	Mark Greaves	27 (8)	3	2	0	4 (3)	0	2	1	35 (11)	4	6	0
9	FW	AUS	Daniel McBreen	31 (7)	5	2	0	7	5	1	0	41 (7)	10	6	0
10	FW	ENG	Craig Farrell	15 (10)	3	1	0	0 (2)	0	0 (2)	0	16 (14)	3	1	0
11	MF	ENG	Simon Russell	16 (8)	0	1 (1)	0	1 (4)	0	2	1	20 (13)	1	0	0
12	MF	ENG	Ben Wilkinson	11 (10)	2	2	0	1	0	1	0	15 (10)	2	0	0
13	GK	ENG	Josh Mimms	4 (2)	0	0	0	0	0	0	0	4 (2)	0	0	0
14	MF	ENG	Steven Hogg	8 (1)	0	0	0	1	0	1	0	10 (1)	0	3	0
15	MF	SCO	Simon Rusk	35 (2)	0	2	0	7	1	1	0	45 (2)	1	7	1
16	FW	ENG	Richard Brodie	29 (9)	15	0	0	8	4	0	0	37 (9)	19	9	1
17	MF	NIR	~~Niall Henderson~~ †	4 (2)	0	0	0	0	0	0	0	4 (2)	0	0	0
17	MF	WAL	Levi Mackin *	15	0	0	0	6	0	0	0	21	0	4	0
18	FW	ENG	Adam Boyes	10 (13)	2	0 (2)	0	6 (1)	1	0 (2)	0	16 (18)	3	1	0
19	MF	ENG	Liam Shepherd	1 (7)	0	0 (1)	0	0 (1)	0	0 (1)	0	1 (10)	0	0	0
20	DF	ENG	Andy McWilliams	14 (2)	0	0	0	7 (1)	0	2	0	23 (3)	0	5	0
21	MF	ENG	~~Jimmy Beadle~~ †	0	0	0	0	0	0	0	0	0	0	0	0
21	MF	ENG	~~Gavin Rothery~~ †	0 (1)	0	1	0	0	0	0 (1)	0	1 (2)	0	0	0
21	DF	WAL	~~Kyle Critchell~~ * †	6	0	0	0	4	0	1	0	11	0	0	0
22	DF	ENG	Josh Radcliffe	0	0	0	0	0 (1)	0	0	0	0 (1)	0	0	0
23	MF	ENG	~~Peter Bore~~ * †	2 (2)	0	0	0	0	0	0	0	2 (2)	0	0	0
23	MF	ENG	Adam Smith	9 (8)	2	0	0	0	0	0	0	9 (8)	2	3	0
24	GK	NIR	Michael Ingham	40	0	2	0	8	0	2	0	52	0	0	0
25	DF	WAL	Shaun Pejic	15	0	0	0	4	0	0	0	19	0	0	0
26	MF	ENG	~~Peter Holmes~~ * †	5	1	0	0	0	0	0	0	5	1	1	0
26	FW	ENG	Simon Brown *	11 (6)	0	0	0	0	0	0	0	11 (6)	0	2	0
27	MF	ENG	Christian Smith	14 (1)	2	0	0	0	0	0	0	14 (1)	2	5	0
28	FW	ENG	~~Bruce Dyer~~ †	2	0	0	0	0	0	1	0	3	0	0	0
28	FW	ENG	Steve Torpey	1 (1)	0	0	0	0	0	0	0	1 (1)	0	0	0

Players not included in matchday squads
No.	Pos.	Nat.	Name
25	DF	ENG	~~Tom Hirst~~ †

== See also ==
- List of York City F.C. seasons
