= Craig Farrell (footballer) =

English footballer (1982–2022)

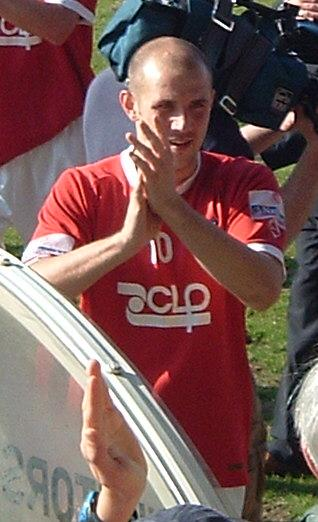
- Farrell playing for York City in 2007

Personal information
- Full name: Craig Wayne Farrell
- Date of birth: 5 December 1982
- Place of birth: Middlesbrough, England
- Date of death: 30 May 2022 (aged 39)
- Place of death: Middlesbrough, England
- Height: 6 ft 0 in (1.83 m)
- Position: Forward

Youth career
- 1991–1998: Middlesbrough
- 1998–2002: Leeds United

Senior career*
Years	Team	Apps	(Gls)
2002	Leeds United	0	(0)
2002	→ Carlisle United (loan)	7	(3)
2002–2005	Carlisle United	74	(17)
2005–2006	Exeter City	38	(8)
2006–2009	York City	91	(21)
2009	→ Oxford United (loan)	15	(2)
2009–2011	Rushden & Diamonds	68	(12)
2011–2012	AFC Telford United	16	(2)
2012	→ Hinckley United (loan)	4	(1)
2012	Hinckley United	12	(5)
2012	Blyth Spartans		
2012–2015	Whitby Town		
Total		325	(71)

International career
1999	England U16	3	(1)
- * Club domestic league appearances and goals

Craig Wayne Farrell (5 December 1982 – 30 May 2022) was an English professional footballer who played as a forward in the Football League for Carlisle United.

== Early life ==
Craig Wayne Farrell was born on 5 December 1982 in Middlesbrough, Cleveland, where he grew up and attended Beechwood First School as a child.

== Club career ==
=== Early career ===
Farrell played for local teams Cleveland Juniors and Marton Boys, before joining the youth system of hometown club Middlesbrough, who he supported as a boy, at the age of eight. He was offered at trial at Leeds United at 15, and was offered a four-year contract at the club after scoring five goals in two matches. He signed his first professional contract at the club in August 2002, after which he joined Third Division club Carlisle United on a one-month loan on 7 October. Following a successful loan spell at Carlisle, Farrell signed for the club permanently on a three-year contract in November for a fee that could have risen to £50,000 depending on appearances. He was placed on Carlisle's transfer list in November 2003 as part of manager Paul Simpson's clear-out, although Farrell said he was prepared to wait patiently to earn a regular place in the first team. He was released by Carlisle in May 2005.

Farrell signed for Conference National club Exeter City on 5 August 2005 on a one-year contract. Soon after joining Exeter, Farrell said he felt the club had the belief and the right kind of players to get promoted, saying: "The players are confident, and we have a really good side here. It's very similar to the Carlisle United side of last year which I got promoted with." He was released by Exeter in May 2006 after scoring eight goals in 45 appearances in the 2005–06 season.

=== York City ===
Farrell joined York City of the Conference National on 27 June 2006. He scored his first goal for York in a 2–2 home draw with Southport on 23 September 2006. York's manager Billy McEwan set Farrell a target of 15 goals for the 2006–07 season during February 2007. He played through the last two months of the season with torn muscle fibres in his thigh. After finishing the season with 10 goals in 51 appearances the club exercised their option to extend his contract for another season.

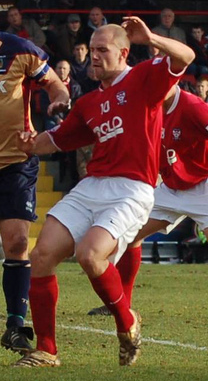
Farrell playing for York City in 2007

He started the 2007–08 season playing as a right winger, and after making seven appearances was unable to feature for over a month due to poor form and a thigh problem. After a struggle to regain fitness, Farrell made his return after coming on as a 69th-minute substitute against Southern League Division One Midlands team Rushall Olympic in the fourth qualifying round of the FA Cup and proceeded to score the third fastest hat-trick in York's history and provide an assist for a fourth goal. Following this, he was voted as player of the round for the fourth qualifying round of the FA Cup. He signed a new contract with York in May 2008.

Farrell scored a goal and provided two assists during a 3–3 draw away to Stevenage Borough in October 2008 after playing as a striker alongside Onome Sodje, which he hoped would see him play in that position on further occasions. York manager Colin Walker challenged him to affirm himself as a striker, and was guaranteed a place in the team for their game against Cambridge United; the first time he would have started consecutive games since August 2008. Conference North club Gateshead attempted to sign Farrell on loan in January 2009 for the remainder of the 2008–09 season, but he rejected this offer, saying he was not interested in moving down a division. On 31 January 2009, he joined York's Conference Premier rivals Oxford United on loan until the end of the season. He made his debut a day later in a 2–1 victory over Lewes. His first goal came in the following game against Barrow, after being assisted by Lewis Haldane, in a game that finished 3–0. He finished the spell with two goals in 15 appearances.

=== Rushden & Diamonds ===
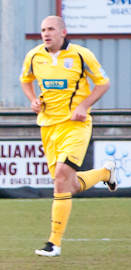
Farrell playing for Rushden & Diamonds in 2010

Farrell joined Conference Premier club Rushden & Diamonds on 12 June 2009, as part of an exchange deal plus £10,000 from York, for striker Michael Rankine. Farrell missed only three matches for Rushden in the 2009–10 season, making 48 appearances and scoring 12 goals. Having scored one goal from 19 matches in the 2010–11 season, he was released by Rushden in May 2011.

=== AFC Telford United ===
Farrell signed for newly promoted Conference Premier club AFC Telford United on 27 June 2011. After making 17 appearances and scoring two goals for Telford he was loaned out to Conference North club Hinckley United on 4 January 2012. He left Telford by mutual consent on 31 January.

=== Hinckley United ===
Upon release from Telford, Farrell signed a contract for Hinckley United in February 2012, where he had spent the previous month on loan. He scored Hinckley's final goal of the 2011–12 season against Stalybridge Celtic on 28 April. He made eighteen appearances and scored six goals for Hinckley that season.

=== Blyth Spartans ===
Farrell signed for newly relegated Northern Premier League Premier Division club Blyth Spartans on 9 June 2012.

=== Whitby Town ===
On 16 November 2012, Farrell joined Blyth's divisional rivals Whitby Town, making his debut in a 3–1 defeat at the Turnbull Ground, against Ashton United. He retired in February 2015 due to a serious hip injury.

== International career ==
Farrell played for the England national under-16 team at the 1999 UEFA European Under-16 Championship and scored in a 3–1 victory over Slovakia. He was capped three times by the under-16 team in 1999.

== Death ==
Farrell died on 30 May 2022, at the age of 39, in Middlesbrough.

== Career statistics ==
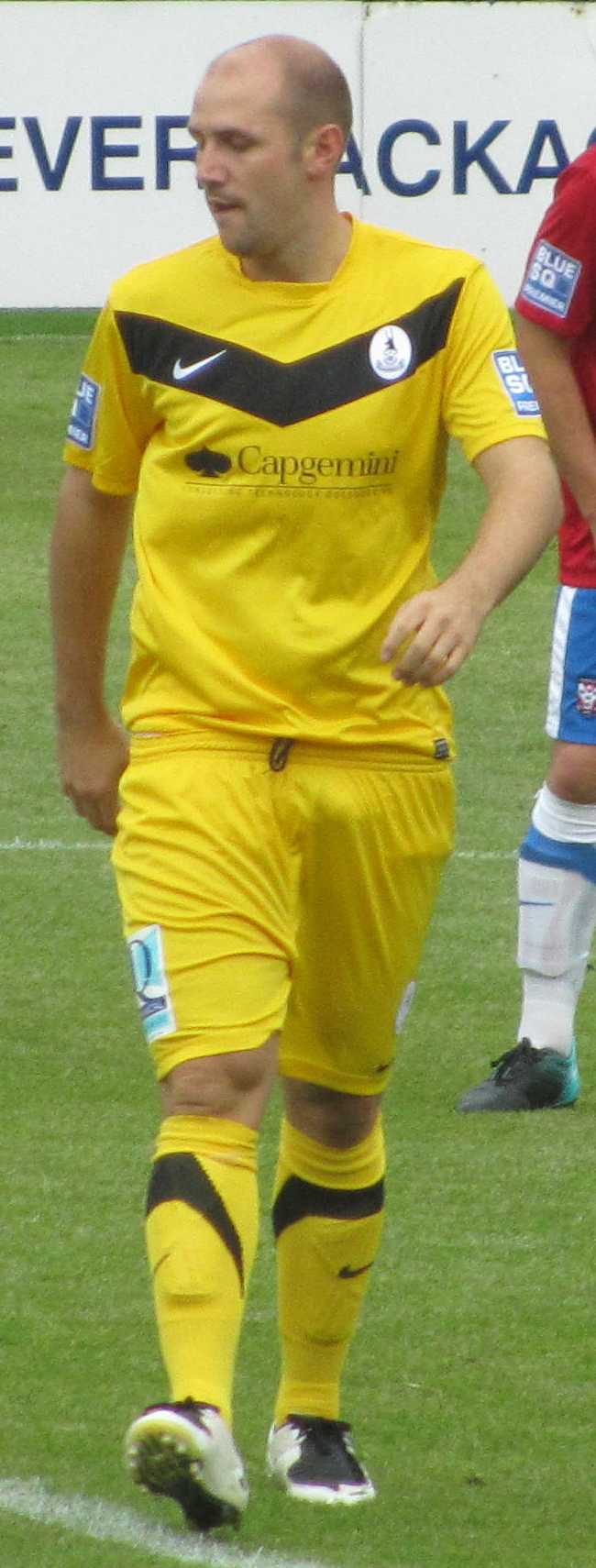
Farrell playing for AFC Telford United in 2011

Appearances and goals by club, season and competition
Club	Season	League			FA Cup		League Cup		Other		Total	
Club	Season	Division	Apps	Goals	Apps	Goals	Apps	Goals	Apps	Goals	Apps	Goals
Leeds United	2002–03	Premier League	0	0	—		—		0	0	0	0
Carlisle United	2002–03	Third Division	33	11	1	1	—		7 (Note: Appearances in Football League Trophy)	2	41	14
Carlisle United	2003–04	Third Division	30	7	1	0	2	0	0	0	33	7
Carlisle United	2004–05	Conference National	18	2	3	1	—		5 (Note: Two appearances inFootball League Trophy, two appearances and two goals in FA Trophy, one appearance and one goal in Conference League Cup)	3	26	6
Carlisle United	Total		81	20	5	2	2	0	12	5	100	27
Exeter City	2005–06	Conference National	38	8	1	0	—		6 (Note: Appearance(s) in FA Trophy)	0	45	8
York City	2006–07	Conference National	46	10	2	0	—		3 (Note: One appearance in FA Trophy, two in Conference National play-offs)	0	51	10
York City	2007–08	Conference Premier	20	8	2	3	—		8 (Note: Six appearances and three goals in FA Trophy, two appearances in Conference League Cup)	3	30	14
York City	2008–09	Conference Premier	25	3	1	0	—		4 (Note: Two appearances in Conference League Cup, two in FA Trophy)	0	30	3
York City	Total		91	21	5	3	—		15	3	111	27
Oxford United (loan)	2008–09	Conference Premier	15	2	—		—		—		15	2
Rushden & Diamonds	2009–10	Conference Premier	41	11	3	0	—		4 (Note: Two appearances and one goal in FA Trophy, two appearances in Conference Premier play-offs)	1	48	12
Rushden & Diamonds	2010–11	Conference Premier	27	1	1	0	—		1	0	29	1
Rushden & Diamonds	Total		68	12	4	0	—		5	1	77	13
AFC Telford United	2011–12	Conference Premier	16	2	1	0	—		0	0	17	2
Hinckley United	2011–12	Conference North	16	6	—		—		2	0	18	6
Career total			325	71	16	5	2	0	40	9	383	85

== Honours ==
Carlisle United

- Football League Trophy runner-up: 2002–03
