= Adam Boyes =

English association football player

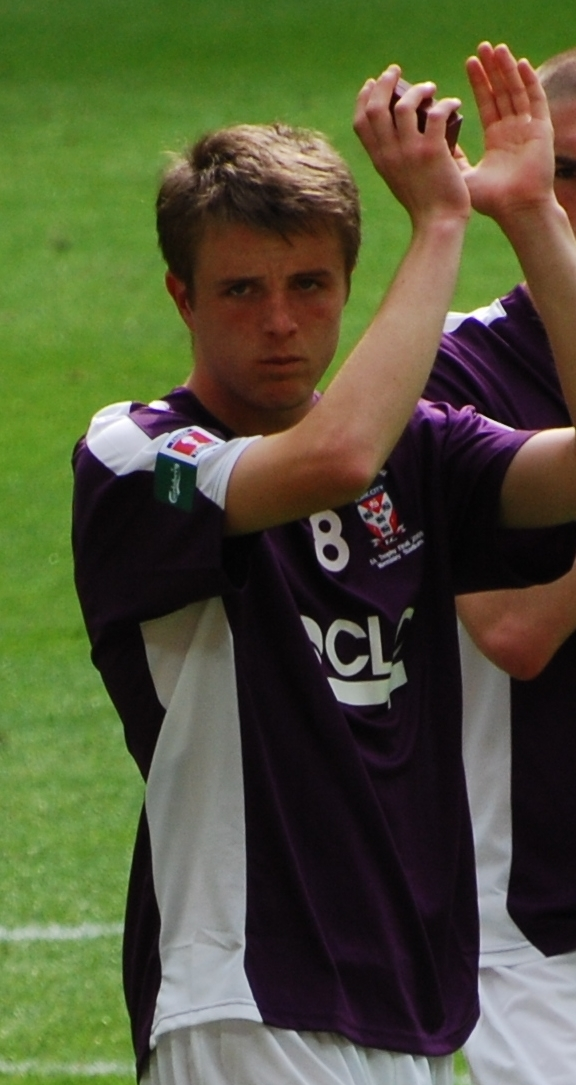
- Boyes after playing for York City in the 2009 FA Trophy Final

Personal information
- Full name: Adam Joseph Boyes
- Date of birth: 1 November 1990 (age 36)
- Place of birth: Lingdale, England
- Height: 6 ft 2 in (1.88 m)
- Position: Striker

Team information
- Current team: Redcar Athletic

Youth career
- 2005–2008: York City

Senior career*
Years	Team	Apps	(Gls)
2008–2009	York City	26	(2)
2009–2011	Scunthorpe United	0	(0)
2009	→ York City (loan)	3	(0)
2010	→ Kidderminster Harriers (loan)	3	(0)
2011	Boston United	17	(6)
2011–2013	Barrow	85	(29)
2013–2014	Gateshead	12	(1)
2014	→ Guiseley (loan)	21	(14)
2014–2017	Guiseley	115	(31)
2017–2018	Bradford Park Avenue	41	(20)
2018–2020	Spennymoor Town	58	(10)
2020–2024	Marske United	94	(56)
2024-	Redcar Athletic	116	(89)

International career
2009–2012	England C	3	(0)
- * Club domestic league appearances and goals as of 22:38, 14 September 2022 (UTC)

Adam Joseph Boyes (born 1 November 1990) is an English semi-professional footballer who plays as a striker for Redcar Athletic.

Boyes began his career with the York City youth system, before making his first-team debut in 2008. Following a trial with Manchester United, he signed a professional contract at York and he scored his first goal against Kidderminster Harriers. After playing in the Final of the FA Trophy at Wembley Stadium, he joined Scunthorpe United in 2009. He had loans with former club York and Kidderminster Harriers during the 2009–10 season. After being released by Scunthorpe in 2011 he signed for Boston United.

== Club career ==
=== York City ===
Born in Lingdale, North Yorkshire, Boyes played for his local team Lingdale before being spotted by a scout for York City. He went on trial with York and subsequently joined the club's Centre of Excellence in 2005. He signed a two-year scholarship with York in June 2007 and was part of the team that progressed to the third round of the 2007–08 FA Youth Cup. While still a first-year scholar, he made his first-team debut on 16 March 2008 as an 84th minute substitute in a 1–0 defeat to Torquay United in the semi-final second leg of the FA Trophy. After scoring a hat-trick for the reserve team against Barnsley, he made his league debut on 8 April as a substitute during York's 4–0 Conference Premier victory away to Stafford Rangers. Following this appearance, manager Colin Walker said "I thought he looked the part and that can only be good for York City football club". He went on to make two further appearances during the 2007–08 season, which he finished with four appearances. He was handed a one-week trial with Premier League champions Manchester United in May 2008, and after this was extended for a second week he played in a youth tournament that included Hibernian, Middlesbrough, Tottenham Hotspur and a Russian team. During the tournament, he scored for United after intercepting the ball from an attempted header back to goal from an opposition player against Premier Soccer League team Supersport United in a 1–1 draw. Following this, he had "etched out a reputation as one of the game's brightest potential stars".

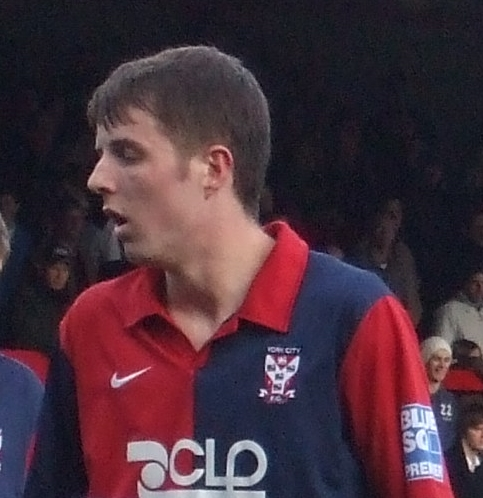
Boyes playing for York City in 2009

He started the 2008–09 season "hovering around the fringes of the first team", and after having made four appearances for York during the season he signed a two-year professional contract in November 2008. Boyes scored his first goal for York on 31 January 2009 in the third round of the FA Trophy against Kidderminster Harriers, which gave York the lead, with the match finishing as a 1–1 draw. He scored his first goal in the Conference Premier with a close-range finish from a Richard Brodie assist to help York to a 2–1 home victory over Forest Green Rovers on 21 April. Following this, York manager Martin Foyle praised Boyes, calling him a "future star". In the following match, he scored York's winner on 77 minutes in a 2–1 victory over Weymouth on 24 April, which secured the team's survival from relegation. He started in the 2009 FA Trophy Final at Wembley Stadium on 9 May, which York lost 2–0 to Stevenage Borough, finishing the season with 34 appearances and 3 goals.

=== Scunthorpe United ===
Boyes signed for Championship club Scunthorpe United on 10 July 2009 on a three-year contract for an undisclosed six-figure fee. He returned to York on an initial one-month loan on 16 October 2009, making his second debut as an 89th-minute substitute in a 1–1 home draw with Oxford United. He returned to Scunthorpe following the completion of the loan on 17 November, having made four appearances for York. He joined Kidderminster Harriers on loan on 1 March 2010 until the end of the 2009–10 season, making his debut as a 63rd-minute substitute in a 2–2 draw with Ebbsfleet United. He made four appearances for Kidderminster before being recalled by Scunthorpe on 29 March. Boyes made his debut for Scunthorpe on 24 August as an 89th-minute substitute in a 4–2 victory over Sheffield Wednesday in the League Cup second round. He was released by the club after his contract was cancelled by mutual consent on 20 January 2011.

=== Boston United ===
Boyes signed for Conference North club Boston United on 28 January 2011 and made his debut in a 2–0 defeat away to Worcester City on 5 February. He missed Boston's match against AFC Telford United on 9 April 2011 after being involved in a car accident earlier in the day. He missed a penalty kick in the penalty shoot-out against Guiseley on 8 May in the play-off semi-final second leg. Boyes was released by Boston at the end of the 2010–11 season after scoring 6 goals in 19 appearances.

=== Barrow ===
Following a trial, he signed for Conference Premier club Barrow on 14 July 2011 on a one-year contract.

=== Gateshead ===
Boyes signed for Conference Premier club Gateshead on 18 May 2013 on a one-year contract. He made his debut on 10 August against Kidderminster Harriers. He scored his first goal for Gateshead on 12 November against Wrexham at the Racecourse Ground.

=== Guiseley ===
Boyes joined Conference North club Guiseley on 23 January 2014 on loan for the remainder of the season. He scored 15 goals in 24 appearances, including scoring in 11 consecutive matches, before signing permanently on 26 May.

=== Bradford Park Avenue ===
Boyes signed for National League North club Bradford Park Avenue on 27 May 2017 on a two-year contract.

=== Spennymoor Town ===
In 2018, Boyes signed for Spennymoor Town. In August, in the match against FC United of Manchester, he came on to replace Glen Taylor, and scored, making it 2–0 full-time.

=== Marske United ===
On 20 June 2020, he transferred to Northern Premier League North-West Division side Marske United, with manager, Carl Jarrett, describing him as "the biggest signing in the clubs history".

During the 2021–22 season, he scored eleven goals in the FA Cup with five coming in one match. On 14 May he received the FA Golden Ball award from Ian Rush for being the top scorer in the season's competition before the final at Wembley Stadium.

== International career ==
Boyes was named in the England C team, who represent England at non-League level, in February 2009, for a friendly against the Malta under-21 team, after initially being placed on standby for the match. He entered the match as a second-half substitute as England won 4–0. It was over two years before Boyes made his next England C appearance, which came on 15 November 2011 after starting a 3–1 defeat away to Gibraltar in a friendly. This was followed by a substitute appearance against Italy in a 1–1 draw on 28 February 2012 in the 2011–2013 International Challenge Trophy. He earned three caps for England C from 2009 to 2012.

== Style of play ==
Boyes plays as a striker, although he has also been used as a left winger, and in this position his retention of the ball was "exemplary". He has described himself "as a player who holds the ball up, although I like to work down the channels as well. I see myself as a decent finisher too." He was said to display "a level of awareness that is rare in a 17-year-old".

== Personal life ==
Boyes attended York College one and a half days a week while with York City.

== Career statistics ==
As of match played 13 September 2022

Appearances and goals by club, season and competition
Club	Season	League			FA Cup		League Cup		Other		Total	
Club	Season	Division	Apps	Goals	Apps	Goals	Apps	Goals	Apps	Goals	Apps	Goals
York City	2007–08	Conference Premier	3	0	0	0	—		1 (Note: Appearance(s) in FA Trophy)	0	4	0
York City	2008–09	Conference Premier	23	2	2	0	—		9 (Note: Two appearances in Conference League Cup, seven appearances and one goal in FA Trophy)	1	34	3
York City	Total		26	2	2	0	—		10	1	38	3
Scunthorpe United	2009–10	Championship	0	0	—		0	0	—		0	0
Scunthorpe United	2010–11	Championship	0	0	0	0	1	0	—		1	0
Scunthorpe United	Total		0	0	0	0	1	0	—		1	0
York City (loan)	2009–10	Conference Premier	3	0	1	0	—		—		4	0
Kidderminster Harriers (loan)	2009–10	Conference Premier	3	0	—		—		1	0	4	0
Boston United	2010–11	Conference North	17	6	—		—		2 (Note: Appearances in Conference North play-offs)	0	19	6
Barrow	2011–12	Conference Premier	42	16	2	4	—		2	2	46	22
Barrow	2012–13	Conference Premier	43	13	5	3	—		5	2	53	18
Barrow	Total		85	29	7	7	—		7	4	99	40
Gateshead	2013–14	Conference Premier	12	1	0	0	—		1	0	13	1
Guiseley (loan)	2013–14	Conference North	21	14	—		—		3	1	24	15
Guiseley	2014–15	Conference North	38	23	3	0	—		6 (Note: Three appearances in FA Trophy, three appearances and one goal in Conference North play-offs)	1	47	24
Guiseley	2015–16	National League	42	6	2	3	—		4	0	48	9
Guiseley	2016–17	National League	35	2	1	1	—		2	0	38	3
Guiseley	Total		136	45	6	4	—		15	2	157	51
Bradford Park Avenue	2017–18	National League North	41	20	3	1	—		3 (Note: Two appearances and one goal in FA Trophy, one appearance and one goal in National League North play-offs)	2	47	23
Spennymoor Town	2018–19	National League North	37	6	1	0	—		7 (Note: Four appearances and three goals in FA Trophy, three in National League North play-offs)	3	45	9
Spennymoor Town	2019–20	National League North	21	4	3	0	—		1	0	25	4
Spennymoor Town	Total		58	10	4	0	—		8	3	70	13
Marske United	2020–21	NPL Division One North-West	5	2	6	3	—		3	4	14	9
Marske United	2021–22	NPL Division One East	36	28	7	11	—		7 (Note: Four appearances and six goals in FA Trophy, two appearances and one goal in Northern Premier League Division One East play-offs, one appearance in North Riding Senior Cup)	7	50	46
Marske United	2022–23	NPL Premier Division	40	18	3	1	—		6	3	49	22
Marske United	2023–24	NPL Premier Division	13	8	1	1	—		1	2	15	12
Total			94	56	17	16	—		17	16	128	89
Redcar Athletic	2023–24	NL Division One	17	14	—						17	14
Redcar Athletic	2024–25	NL Division One	38	19	2	0	—		6 (Note: 4 appearances and 4 goals in FA Vase, 2 appearances in North Riding Senior Cup)	4	46	23
Redcar Athletic	2025–26	NPL Division One East	42	41	4	2	—		4 (Note: 1 appearance in FA Trophy, 3 appearances in North Riding Senior Cup)	0	50	43
Redcar Athletic	2026–27	NPL Premier Division	19	15	2	0	—		1 (Note: 1 appearance in FA Trophy)	0	22	15
Total			116	89	8	2	—		11	4	135	95
Career total			591	258	48	30	1	0	75	32	714	321

== Honours ==
Guiseley

- Conference North play-offs: 2015

Marske United

- FA Cup Golden Ball (Top Scorer): 2021–22 (11 Goals)
