= Simon Rusk =

Football manager (born 1981)

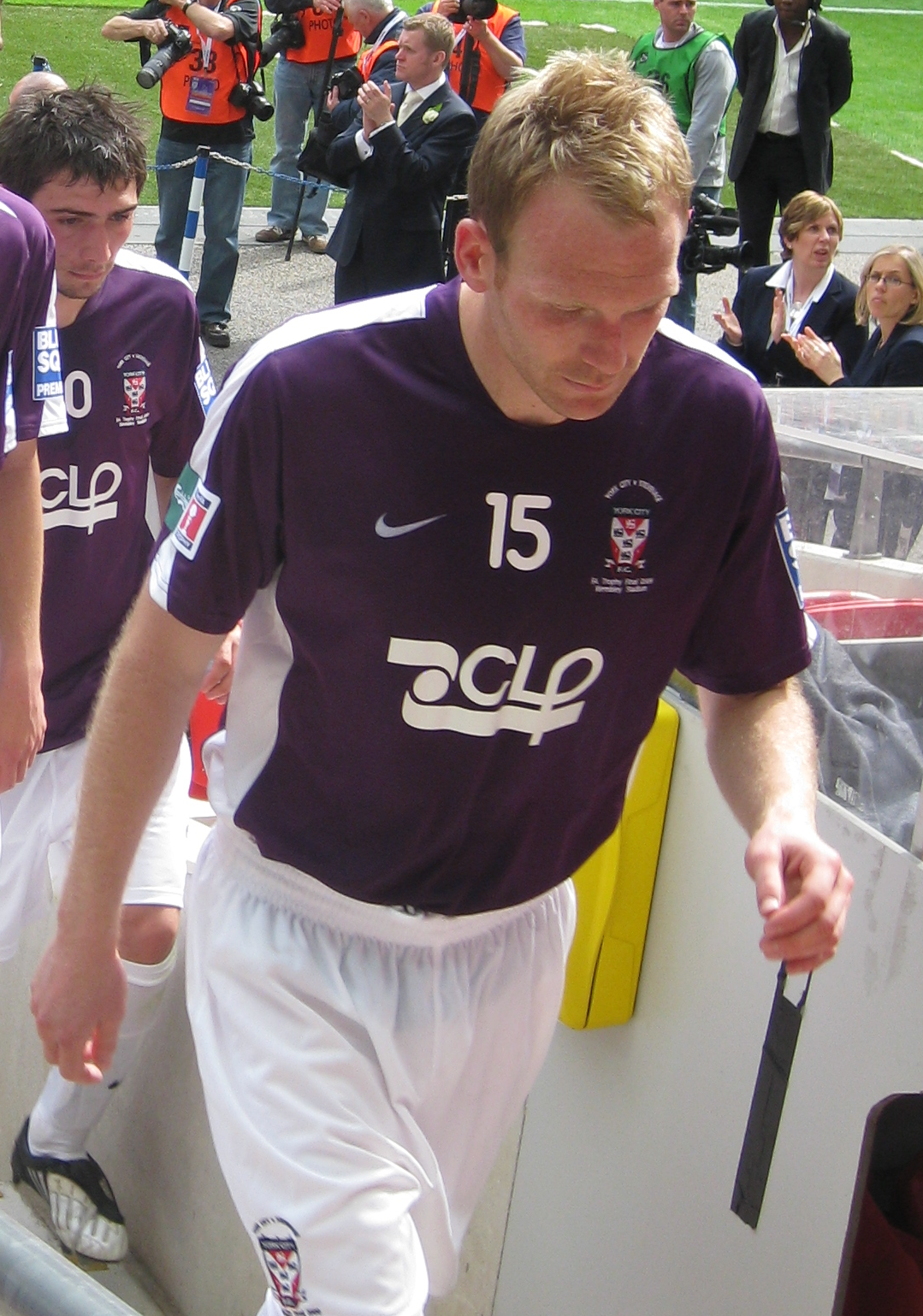
- Rusk after playing for York City in the 2009 FA Trophy Final

Personal information
- Full name: Simon Edward Rusk
- Date of birth: 17 December 1981 (age 44)
- Place of birth: Peterborough, England
- Position: Midfielder

Youth career
- 1995–2000: Peterborough United

Senior career*
Years	Team	Apps	(Gls)
2000–2001	Peterborough United	0	(0)
2000	→ Cambridge City (loan)	3	(0)
2001–2007	Boston United	140	(12)
2007–2008	Northwich Victoria	16	(2)
2007	→ Rushden & Diamonds (loan)	6	(0)
2008–2009	York City	51	(0)
2009–2011	Crawley Town	54	(0)
Total		267	(14)

Managerial career
- 2021: Stockport County
- 2022–2023: England U19
- 2024: Southampton (interim)
- 2025: Southampton (interim)
- * Club domestic league appearances and goals

Simon Edward Rusk (born 17 December 1981) is an English professional football manager and former professional player who most recently was interim head coach at Southampton.

He holds a UEFA pro licence. Previously manager of Brighton & Hove Albion Under 23s, Rusk was responsible for the progression of many young talents to the Brighton first-team in recent years, including Aaron Connolly, Steven Alzate, Solly March and Ben White. As a player, he played as a midfielder, notably for Boston United.

== Playing career ==
=== Boston United ===
Rusk was born in Peterborough, Cambridgeshire, and grew up in the suburb of Bretton. He joined the Peterborough United youth system in 1995 and had a spell on loan in the Southern Football League Premier Division with Cambridge City during the 1999–2000 season. He was signed on a free transfer by Boston United in March 2001 after being released by Peterborough. His Boston debut came in March 2001 in a match at Doncaster Rovers. He was fined by manager Steve Evans for receiving a red card against Shrewsbury Town in December 2005. He had surgery on a knee injury in December 2006, which ruled him out until after Christmas.

=== Northwich Victoria ===
He left Boston to join Northwich Victoria on a free transfer on 2 July 2007, being signed by former Boston teammate Neil Redfearn. Rusk scored on his debut for Northwich, in the 2–1 loss against Ebbsfleet United, which was the first game for Ebbsfleet under this name, having previously been known as Gravesend & Northfleet. In September 2007, Rusk was placed on the club's transfer list and joined Rushden & Diamonds on a one-month loan later that month.

=== York City ===
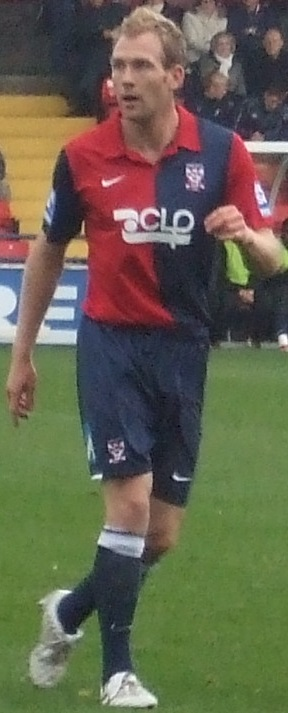
Rusk playing for York City in 2008

Manager Dino Maamria confirmed in January 2008 he was to move, with Weymouth believed to be his next destination. However, he signed a one-and-a-half-year contract with York City on a free transfer on 8 January. He made his debut in the team's 2–0 win against Aldershot Town in January and finished the season with 14 appearances for the club. He suffered a medial knee ligament injury during York's 1–1 draw with Torquay United on 28 August, which saw him substituted for Niall Henderson in the 73rd minute. He made his return on 20 September in a 1–1 with Salisbury City. He scored the winning penalty for York in a 4–2 penalty shoot-out victory against Mansfield Town in the Conference League Cup third round on 4 November, which finished 1–1 after extra time. He started in the FA Trophy Final at Wembley Stadium on 9 May 2009, which York lost 2–0 to Stevenage Borough. He was released by York following the end of the 2008–09 season, during which he made 47 appearances and scored one goal.

=== Crawley Town ===
Rusk joined Conference Premier team Crawley Town on 27 May 2009. He made his debut as a 22nd-minute substitute in a 4–0 defeat against Mansfield Town. Rusk went on to feature regularly during his first season for the club, making 42 appearances, many of which were at right-back. He was offered a new one-year contract in April 2010, which he signed in May. In February 2011, Rusk was an 81st-minute substitute in Crawley Town's 1–0 FA Cup defeat to Manchester United at Old Trafford.

Due to a number of serious injuries, he retired following the end of the 2010–11 to take a role with Crawley's Centre of Excellence ahead of their first season in the Football League. He was appointed a youth team coach at Brighton & Hove Albion on 6 March 2012, a role involving overseeing the development of the club's scholars and managing the under-18 team.

== Coaching career ==
=== Brighton & Hove Albion U23s ===
Rusk was appointed U23s Head coach in March 2015, stepping up from his role as U18s coach.

In February 2016, he was promoted to first-team coach by Chris Hughton until the end of the season, replacing the outgoing Nathan Jones. In the sixteen remaining games of the season, they lost just once as they sealed third-place in The Championship, missing out on automatic promotion by goal difference.

In the first year of Premier League 2's current format - he guided the Seagulls to an 8th-placed finish and reached the last sixteen of the EFL Trophy.

The following year, his side finished third in the league and won promotion to Premier League 2 Division 1 - the highest level for U23s football - for the first time ever, following a 2–0 victory over Aston Villa in the play-offs.

The 2018–2019 season saw a string of impressive results, including a 5–0 win over Manchester City , as they went unbeaten in their first six games. Rusk's side finished the season in third-place, higher than a number of established academies, including Chelsea, Liverpool, Tottenham and West Ham United.

Despite losing a number of key players to the senior squad in 2019–20, the side continued their good form and reached the knockout stages of the EFL Trophy for a second time under Rusk's management.

=== Stockport County ===
On 27 January 2021, Rusk became the manager of National League side Stockport County. On 27 October 2021, the club confirmed they had parted ways with Rusk.

=== Dundee ===
On 17 February 2022, Rusk was announced as assistant manager of Scottish Premiership side Dundee under his assistant manager at Stockport, Mark McGhee until the end of the season. After the side was relegated with just one win in the duo's time there, it was confirmed in May 2022 that Rusk would take up a role with the English FA.

=== England ===
On 13 May 2022, Rusk was appointed a national coach with England men's teams. On 16 August 2022, it was confirmed that Rusk would take charge of the England U19s.

=== Nottingham Forest ===
On 13 December 2023, it was revealed that Rusk had been hired as a specialist set-piece coach at Premier League side Nottingham Forest.

=== Southampton ===
On 1 July 2024, he was announced as head coach of Southampton U21s. Following the sacking of Russell Martin on 15 December 2024, Rusk was appointed interim manager of Southampton. Rusk took charge of two matches for the club before the appointment of new manager Ivan Jurić, a 2–1 home defeat against Liverpool in the EFL Cup on 18 December and a 0–0 draw against Fulham in the Premier League on 22 December. On 24 February 2025, Rusk joined Jurić's backroom staff as a first team coach.

Following the departure of Jurić on 7 April, Rusk agreed to become interim manager for the remainder of the season with Adam Lallana joining him as assistant. On 19 April, Rusk led Southampton to a 1–1 draw against West Ham United which saw them reach 11 points, and thus avoid breaking Derby County's record for the lowest points tally in Premier League history. On 25 June, Southampton confirmed that Rusk had left the club.

== Career statistics ==
Appearances and goals by club, season and competition
Club	Season	League^{[A]}		FA Cup		League Cup		Other^{[B]}		Total	
Club	Season	Apps	Goals	Apps	Goals	Apps	Goals	Apps	Goals	Apps	Goals
Boston United	2000–01	8	2	0	0	0	0	0	0	8	2
Boston United	2001–02	27	2	1	0	0	0	1	0	29	2
Boston United	2002–03	18	2	1	0	1	0	1	0	21	2
Boston United	2003–04	19	0	0	0	1	0	0	0	20	0
Boston United	2004–05	31	3	4	0	2	0	1	0	38	3
Boston United	2005–06	34	3	2	1	1	0	1	0	38	4
Boston United	2006–07	3	0	0	0	0	0	1	0	4	0
Boston United	Total	140	12	8	1	5	0	5	0	158	13
Northwich Victoria	2007–08	16	2	2	0	0	0	1	0	19	2
Rushden & Diamonds (loan)	2007–08	6	0	0	0	0	0	0	0	6	0
York City	2007–08	14	0	0	0	0	0	0	0	14	0
York City	2008–09	37	0	2	0	0	0	8	1	47	1
York City	Total	51	0	2	0	0	0	8	1	61	1
Crawley Town	2009–10	38	0	2	0	0	0	2	0	42	0
Crawley Town	2010–11	16	0	1	0	0	0	0	0	17	0
Crawley Town	Total	54	0	3	0	0	0	2	0	59	0
Career total		267	14	15	1	5	0	16	1	303	16

A. The "League" column constitutes appearances and goals in the Football League and Football Conference.
B. The "Other" column constitutes appearances and goals in the Conference League Cup, FA Trophy and Football League Trophy.

== Managerial statistics ==
As of match played 25 May 2025

Managerial record by team and tenure
Team	From	To	Record				
Team	From	To	P	W	D	L	Win %
Stockport County	27 January 2021	27 October 2021	42	21	12	9	50.0
Southampton (caretaker)	15 December 2024	22 December 2024	2	0	1	1	0.0
Southampton (caretaker)	7 April 2025	25 May 2025	7	0	2	5	0.0
Career Total			51	21	15	15	41.2

== Honours ==
=== Player ===
Boston United

- Football Conference: 2001–02

Crawley Town

- Conference Premier: 2010–11

=== Coach ===
Brighton & Hove Albion U23s

- Premier League 2: Division 2 Play-Off Winner 2017–18
