= Kyle Critchell =

Association football player (born 1987)

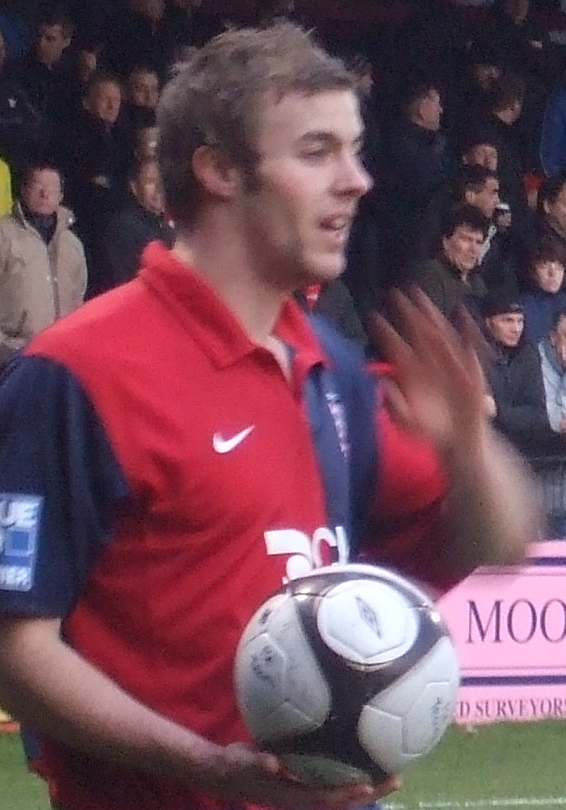
- Critchell playing for York City in 2009

Personal information
- Full name: Kyle Adrian Ross Critchell
- Date of birth: 18 January 1987 (age 39)
- Place of birth: Dorchester, England
- Height: 6 ft 0 in (1.83 m)
- Positions: Defender; midfielder

Team information
- Current team: Portland United

Youth career
- ?–2003: Weymouth
- 2003–2006: Southampton

Senior career*
Years	Team	Apps	(Gls)
2006–2007	Southampton	0	(0)
2006–2007	→ Torquay United (loan)	7	(0)
2007	Chesterfield	10	(0)
2007–2008	Weymouth	35	(0)
2008–2009	Wrexham	2	(0)
2009	→ York City (loan)	6	(0)
2009	→ Weymouth (loan)	8	(0)
2009	Weymouth	16	(0)
2009–2012	Dorchester Town	92	(7)
2012–2015	Weymouth	26	(1)
2015–2016	Portland United	11	(1)

International career
2003	Wales U17	5	(0)
2005–2006	Wales U21	3	(0)
2008–2010	Wales Semi-Pro	4	(0)

Managerial career
- 2022–2024: Portland United
- 2025–: Portland United
- * Club domestic league appearances and goals

Kyle Adrian Ross Critchell (born 18 January 1987) is a football manager who is first team manager of Portland United.

Critchell progressed through the youth and reserve teams at Southampton and had a loan period at Torquay United. He left for Chesterfield and was released by them after half a season, when he moved to Weymouth. A move to Wrexham followed and following an injury he was loaned out to York City and Weymouth. He re-signed for Weymouth following their relegation to the Conference South and later joined league rivals Dorchester Town in 2009. He returned to Weymouth in 2012.

Critchell has represented Wales at various levels. He gained five caps for the under-17 team, before making three appearances for the under-21 team from 2005 to 2006. He has made four appearances for the semi-professional team, making his debut against England C in 2008.

== Club career ==
Born in Dorchester, Dorset, Critchell joined Southampton as a trainee in July 2003 after being spotted playing for Weymouth's reserve team. He played in both legs of the FA Youth Cup semi-final in 2005, and suffered from a broken ankle in the second leg, which Southampton won in a penalty shoot-out. In the 2005 pre-season he made his first appearance in the Southampton first team during pre-season and signed a professional contract with the club on 4 August 2005, but spent most of the 2005–06 season out with a cruciate ligament injury.

He joined League Two side Torquay United on a two-month loan in October 2006. He made his league debut on 28 October 2006 in Torquay's 0–0 draw at home to Shrewsbury Town and finished the loan period with 10 appearances. He moved to Chesterfield of League One on a free transfer on 19 January 2007, signing a contract taking him to the end of the 2006–07 season. He made his debut in a 1–0 defeat to Brighton & Hove Albion on 20 January. During a game against Crewe Alexandra on 7 April he picked up a groin strain, which resulted in him undergoing a scan. He also suffered from a virus while at the club and was released in May 2007, after making 10 appearances as Chesterfield were relegated to League Two.

Critchell trained with Conference Premier side Weymouth and signed a two-year contract on 20 June 2007. He made his debut on 11 August, the opening day of the 2007–08 season, in a 2–1 victory over Halifax Town. Following a 3–1 defeat to Stafford Rangers for Weymouth, manager Jason Tindall singled out Critchell for praise, saying; "The only one out there today who deserves any credit for their performance was Kyle Critchell but overall it was not good enough". He was sent off against Altrincham on the final day of the season after clashing with Gary Scott and he finished the season with 42 appearances.

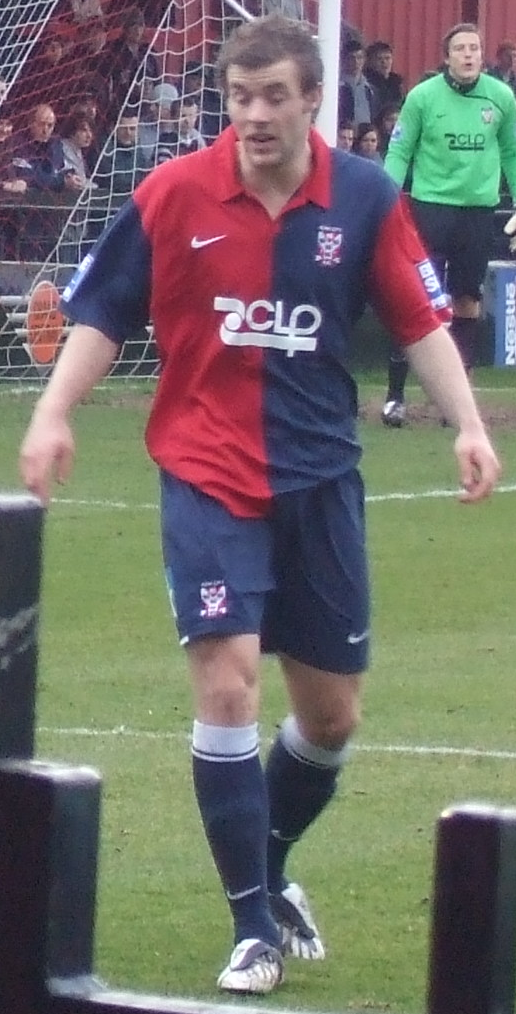
Critchell playing for York City in 2009

Critchell signed a two-year contract with newly relegated Conference Premier side Wrexham on 24 June 2008. He made his debut in a 2–0 victory over Oxford United, where he played in right midfield. After making a further appearance for Wrexham he suffered from an ankle injury during a training session. He underwent surgery on this ankle in October, which had been delayed due to illness. After recovering from this injury four months later, he said he was looking to be loaned out to help improve his first-team chances at Wrexham. He eventually joined fellow Conference Premier side York City on a one-month loan on 5 January 2009. He was due to make his debut a day later against former club Weymouth, but the match was postponed. He eventually made his first appearance after playing in the 2–1 victory over Oxford on 13 January in the second round of the FA Trophy. This was followed by his league debut on 17 January in a 3–0 victory over Lewes. The loan was extended for a second month on 4 February and finished his time at York with 11 appearances.

He rejoined Weymouth on loan in March until 24 April and made his debut in a 2–0 defeat to Kettering Town. He finished the season with eight appearances for Weymouth, while the club was relegated to the Conference South. After making two appearances for Wrexham, he was released on 8 June, after agreeing a deal for his contract to be cancelled. He then re-signed for Weymouth for the 2009–10 season on a permanent contract in June. Critchell left Weymouth in November to join local rivals and hometown club Dorchester Town. He finished the season with 20 appearances for Dorchester. Critchell made 40 appearances and scored three goals in the 2010–11 season.

Critchell re-signed for Weymouth on a two-year contract for an undisclosed fee on 9 August 2012, with the club now in the Southern League Premier Division. He explained the transfer by saying "The biggest reason why I have come back is seeing everyone smiling and being positive again. The right atmosphere seems to be back at the club and that can only bode well for the future".

== International career ==
Despite being born in England, he has represented Wales at under-17 level, with whom he gained five caps. He made his debut for the Wales under-21 team in a 1–0 victory against Austria on 25 March 2005. He was named in the squad to face Turkey in September 2006, which proved to be his final appearance for the team. He was forced into withdrawing from the squad in February 2007 for a friendly against Northern Ireland due to injury.

He was called into the Wales Semi-Pro team for their match against England C in February 2008 and made his debut in this match, with Wales being defeated 2–1. He was named in the squad for the Four Nations tournament in May.

== Coaching career ==
In January 2023 Critchell was announced as the new manager of Portland United, a role he stayed in until stepping down in September 2024. He had managed 73 matches there, winning 34 and scoring 124 goals. In January 2025 he was announced to have rejoined Portland United as a joint manager, alongside Craig Adams.

== Style of play ==
Described as "an extremely versatile player with boundless energy", Critchell has a preference for playing at right back, although he can also play on the left or in midfield. While in the Weymouth youth system, he played as a striker.

== Career statistics ==
As of match played 23 February 2013.

Club statistics
Club	Season	League			FA Cup		League Cup		Other		Total	
Club	Season	Division	Apps	Goals	Apps	Goals	Apps	Goals	Apps	Goals	Apps	Goals
Southampton	2006–07	Championship	0	0	0	0	0	0	0	0	0	0
Torquay United (loan)	2006–07	League Two	7	0	3	0	0	0	0	0	10	0
Chesterfield	2006–07	League One	10	0	0	0	0	0	0	0	10	0
Weymouth	2007–08	Conference Premier	35	0	0	0	—		7 (Note: Four appearances in FA Trophy, three in Conference League Cup)	0	42	0
Wrexham	2008–09	Conference Premier	2	0	0	0	—		0	0	2	0
York City (loan)	2008–09	Conference Premier	6	0	0	0	—		5 (Note: Four appearances in FA Trophy, one in Conference League Cup)	0	11	0
Weymouth (loan)	2008–09	Conference Premier	8	0	0	0	—		0	0	8	0
Weymouth	2009–10	Conference South	16	0	0	0	—		0	0	16	0
Weymouth	Total		24	0	0	0	—		0	0	24	0
Dorchester Town	2009–10	Conference South	20	0	0	0	—		0	0	20	0
Dorchester Town	2010–11	Conference South	34	3	2	0	—		4 (Note: Appearance(s) in FA Trophy)	0	40	3
Dorchester Town	2011–12	Conference South	38	4	1	0	—		1	0	40	4
Dorchester Town	Total		92	7	3	0	—		5	0	100	7
Weymouth	2012–13	Southern League Premier	26	1	2	0	—		2	0	30	1
Career total			202	8	8	0	0	0	19	0	229	8
