= Ben Wilkinson =

English footballer (born 1987)

Personal information
- Full name: Alistair Benjamin Wilkinson
- Date of birth: 25 April 1987 (age 39)
- Place of birth: Sheffield, England
- Height: 5 ft 11 in (1.80 m)
- Position: Midfielder

Team information
- Current team: Derby County (first-team coach)

Youth career
- Sheffield Wednesday
- Sheffield United
- 2003–2005: Derby County
- 2005–2006: Hull City

Senior career*
Years	Team	Apps	(Gls)
2006–2008	Hull City	0	(0)
2006–2007	→ Harrogate Town (loan)	3	(0)
2008	→ Gretna (loan)	13	(0)
2008–2009	York City	21	(2)
2009	→ Altrincham (loan)	9	(0)
2009–2010	Chester City	0	(0)
2010–2011	Tamworth	28	(2)
2011	Boston United	8	(0)
Total		82	(4)

Managerial career
- 2024–2026: Manchester City EDS
- * Club domestic league appearances and goals

Alistair Benjamin Wilkinson (born 25 April 1987) is a former professional footballer who coaches at Derby County. He played as a midfielder for Hull City, Harrogate Town, Gretna, York City, Altrincham, Chester City, Tamworth and Boston United.

After retirement as a player, Wilkinson moved into coaching working at Sheffield Wednesday's and Manchester City's academies, before joining Derby County first-team coaching setup in 2026.

== Playing career ==
=== Early career ===
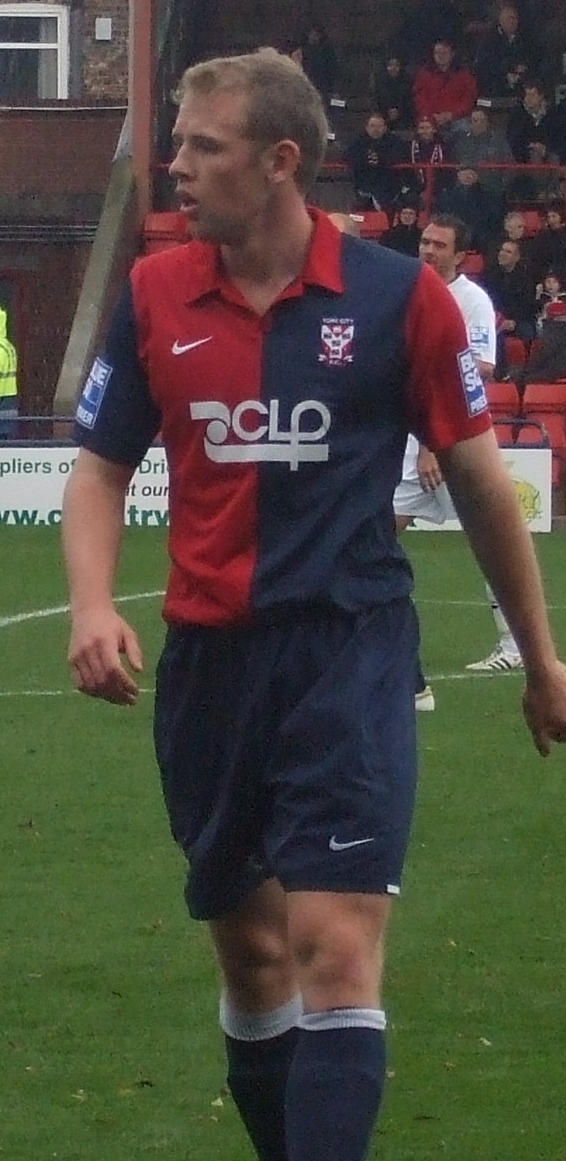
Wilkinson playing for York City in 2008

Born in Sheffield, South Yorkshire, Wilkinson is the son of former player and manager Howard Wilkinson. He played with the youth teams of Sheffield Wednesday, Sheffield United and Derby County, becoming a scholar with the latter in May 2003. He joined Hull City in January 2005, where he completed his scholarship. He signed a two-year professional contract with Hull in the summer of 2006. He joined Conference North club Harrogate Town on 9 December 2006 on a one-month loan, where he made five appearances before returning to Hull in January 2007.

Wilkinson went on trial with York City of the Conference National in January 2008, in which he scored two goals in a reserve-team match against Sheffield United. On 31 January 2008, he joined Gretna of the Scottish Premier League on loan until the end of the 2007–08 season. He made his debut in a 2–0 away defeat against Heart of Midlothian on 9 February 2008 and made 13 appearances for the club.

=== York City ===
He joined Conference Premier club York City on 10 June 2008 on a two-year contract. His debut came in a 1–0 away win against Crawley Town on 9 August 2008. He scored his first goal in a 3–1 defeat away to Wrexham on 7 October 2008.

On 26 March 2009, Wilkinson joined York's Conference Premier rivals Altrincham on loan until the end of 2008–09. He made his debut two days later, coming on as a 90th-minute substitute in a 2–2 home draw with Crawley Town, and started in the subsequent match, a 1–0 away defeat to Ebbsfleet United. He finished the spell with nine appearances. He left York on 2 July 2009 after his contract was cancelled by mutual consent.

=== Chester City ===
Wilkinson signed for newly relegated Conference Premier club Chester City on 9 July 2009. Wilkinson scored in the first minute of his debut against Cambridge United on 15 August 2009, but Chester lost 4–2. He made 28 appearances for Chester in 2009–10, although these were expunged from the records after Chester were expelled from the Football Conference in March 2010. He left the club following their liquidation on 10 March 2010 and in April went on trial with League Two club Bradford City, playing in reserve-team matches against Newcastle United and Leeds United.

=== Tamworth ===
Wilkinson signed for Conference Premier club Tamworth on 26 August 2010 following a trial. His first goal came in a 1–0 away win over Mansfield Town, with a shot into the bottom corner from six yards from Danny Thomas' pass on 30 minutes. Wilkinson scored a goal against York in a 2–1 away win on 16 April 2011 to help Tamworth fight relegation.

=== Boston United ===
Wilkinson signed for Conference North club Boston United on 30 July 2011 after a trial, having been set to follow former Tamworth players Aaron Mitchell and Jason Bradley to Eastwood Town. He found himself out of the team early in 2011–12 because of a knee injury but later established himself at right back due to a shortage in that position. He left Boston on 7 November 2011 after making 10 appearances for the club.

== Coaching career ==
By November 2013, Wilkinson had taken on the position of youth development phase coach at Sheffield Wednesday.

He joined Manchester City's academy in July 2018 as Under 23 Assistant Coach to Paul Harsley. In August 2020, he moved into a role as Under 16 Lead Coach. In July 2021, he moved into the role of under-18 lead coach during this time he won several major youth honors, including helping the club become the first side to win three consecutive national titles and the FA Youth Cup. Later progressing to the under-21 and lead EDS coach role in July 2024. His Manchester City U19 side infamously handed Álvaro Arbeloa’s Real Madrid team their first loss in the UEFA Youth League, beating the Spanish side 4-0 in our final League Phase game of 2025/26. While under his tenure at Manchester City Ben Wilkinson’s Elite Development Squad lifted their fourth PL2 trophy 2024/25 making history. He is known for taking an integral role in the development of Nico O'Reilly as he broke into the first team under Pep Guardiola. He worked closely with first-team figures including Pep Guardiola, having travelled with the squad to the 2025 FIFA Club World Cup and overseen the integration of academy talent into senior environments. Leaving City on 30 June 2026.

On 1 July 2026, Wilkinson joined the first-team coaching setup at EFL Championship club Derby County, working under head coach John Eustace.

== Career statistics ==
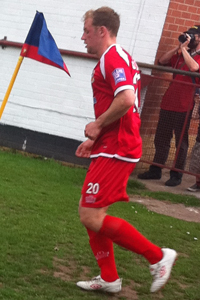
Wilkinson playing for Tamworth in 2011

Appearances and goals by club, season and competition
Club	Season	League			National Cup		League Cup		Other		Total	
Club	Season	Division	Apps	Goals	Apps	Goals	Apps	Goals	Apps	Goals	Apps	Goals
Hull City	2006–07	Championship	0	0	0	0	0	0	—		0	0
Hull City	2007–08	Championship	0	0	0	0	0	0	0	0	0	0
Hull City	Total		0	0	0	0	0	0	0	0	0	0
Harrogate Town (loan)	2006–07	Conference North	3	0	—		—		2 (Note: Appearance(s) in FA Trophy)	0	5	0
Gretna (loan)	2007–08	Scottish Premier League	13	0	—		—		—		13	0
York City	2008–09	Conference Premier	21	2	2	0	—		2 (Note: One appearance in Conference League Cup, one in FA Trophy)	0	25	2
Altrincham (loan)	2008–09	Conference Premier	9	0	—		—		—		9	0
Tamworth	2010–11	Conference Premier	28	2	2	0	—		1	0	31	2
Boston United	2011–12	Conference North	8	0	2	0	—		—		10	0
Career total			82	4	6	0	0	0	5	0	93	4
