= Ryan Baldacchino =

English footballer (born 1981)

Personal information
- Full name: Ryan Lee Baldacchino
- Date of birth: 13 January 1981 (age 45)
- Place of birth: Leicester, England
- Position: Midfielder

Senior career*
Years	Team	Apps	(Gls)
1997–2000	Blackburn Rovers	0	(0)
2000–2002	Bolton Wanderers	0	(0)
2002–2003	Carlisle United	23	(0)
2003–2008	Gretna	95	(13)
2007	→ Ayr United (loan)	4	(0)
2008–2009	Altona Magic	14	(1)
2009–2010	Bonnyrigg White Eagles	9	(0)
2010–2011	Forest Hill Milford Utd.	25	(18)
2012–	Hume City	7	(0)
- * Club domestic league appearances and goals as of 31 January 2014

Ryan Lee Baldacchino (born 13 January 1981) is an English professional footballer who plays for Australian club Hume City. He is capable of playing at both defensive midfield, and winger. Previous clubs include Blackburn Rovers, Bolton, Carlisle and Gretna over a 10-year professional career.

== Career ==
Ryan Baldacchino began his footballing career at Blackburn Rovers in 1996 as a promising winger capable of playing on either wing. With Blackburn, he went on to win the U17 Premier League and reach the FA Youth Cup final, playing in front of a 25,000-strong crowd against an Everton team featuring future Premiership footballers Leon Osman, Francis Jeffers, Richard Dunne and Michael Ball.

Baldacchino went on to become a reserve team regular in forthcoming seasons and was rewarded with a four-year professional contract, but was transferred to Blackburn's local rivals Bolton Wanderers in March 2000 as comparisons to his former Blackburn teammates Damien Duff and David Dunn were made by his new manager Sam Allardyce and assistant manager Phil Brown. He was awarded squad number 33.

With pace to burn and accurate crossing ability Baldacchino soon showed his potential in Bolton's reserve side and in pre-season games for the first team. However, the signings of Jay-Jay Okocha and Youri Djorkaeff hindered his chances of making a first-team breakthrough and he left Bolton after only 18 months, signing with Carlisle United on a three-year deal. Baldacchino was an instant hit with the club with an outstanding display of pace and trickery to help defeat Southend United away in his first match. Baldacchino was a regular for Carlisle before being prised away by Brooks Mileson and the spending power of Scottish club Gretna. Gretna, with their newfound wealth, won Scottish Third, Second and First Division titles in consecutive seasons, with Baldacchino one of the club's star players; he and Gretna teammates Kenny Deuchar, Gavin Skelton and Chris Innes became the only four players in 100 years of Scottish football history to play in all Scottish football divisions with the same team. Baldacchino's time with Gretna saw him win countless man of the match award, the goal of the season award and even score a goal in the UEFA Europa League. An impressive display against Dunfermline Athletic in the Scottish Cup in front of then-Celtic manager Gordon Strachan earned Baldacchino rave reviews, Hibs, Motherwell and Celtic all had regular checks on Baldacchino. Brooks Mileson once again showed his spending power and ambition by keeping hold of Baldacchino and he signed a new improved four-year deal in December 2005 making him one of the club's top earners.

The season 2007–08 was to be Gretna's last year as a club as they bowed out at the top when owner Brooks Mileson took ill in late February. Baldacchino was given squad number 7 and played against Rangers and Celtic that season as Gretna struggled to cope with life in the top flight. They were relegated at the end of the season.

Baldacchino transferred to VPL club Altona Magic in May 2008 and one year later he signed for New South Wales Premier League outfit Bonnyrigg White Eagles. Before moving to Forest Hill Milford United on a free transfer.
