= Steven Hogg =

English footballer

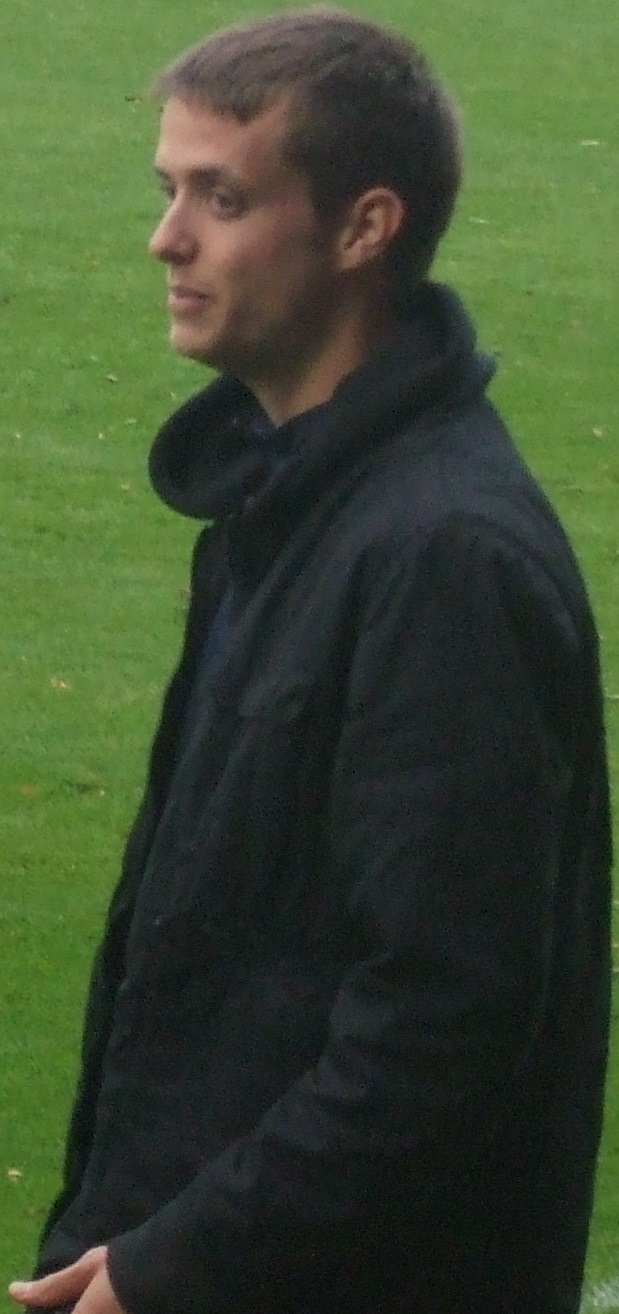
- Hogg with York City in 2008

Personal information
- Full name: Steven Roy Hogg
- Date of birth: 1 October 1985 (age 41)
- Place of birth: Heywood, England
- Height: 6 ft 3 in (1.91 m)
- Position: Midfielder

Youth career
- ?–2005: Manchester United

Senior career*
Years	Team	Apps	(Gls)
2005–2007	Shrewsbury Town	13	(0)
2007–2008	Gretna	15	(1)
2008–2009	York City	9	(0)
- Roach Dynamos
2011	Rochdale Town	7	(0)
2011–????	Salford City		
- * Club domestic league appearances and goals

Steven Roy Hogg (born 1 October 1985) is an English former footballer who played as a midfielder.

== Career ==
Born in Heywood, Greater Manchester, Hogg began his career as a trainee with Manchester United but was released after the end of the 2004–05 season. He had trials with Liverpool, but eventually trained with League Two side Shrewsbury Town, who signed him on a two-year contract on 4 June 2005, with manager Gary Peters describing him as "Glenn Hoddle with a left foot". He made his debut for the team on the opening day 1–0 defeat at home to Rochdale on 6 August, coming on as an 81st-minute substitute. He was allowed to leave the club on loan in January 2006. He finished the 2005–06 season with 16 appearances in all competitions for Shrewsbury.

He joined Gretna in January 2007, having been spotted by Gretna's director of football Mick Wadsworth who was assistant manager at Shrewsbury during Hogg's first season. He made four appearances in the Scottish First Division (SPL) as Gretna won promotion to the Scottish Premier League. He made 12 appearances and scored a goal against Inverness Caledonian Thistle as Gretna finished bottom of the SPL. In May 2008, Hogg was part of the remaining 40 staff members who were released by Gretna due to their financial uncertainty.

He returned to English football when he joined Conference Premier side York City on 11 June 2008. After contracting shingles, he missed the start of the 2008–09 season, and after also suffering from a thigh injury he returned to full training in September. He made his return in a 2–1 victory for the reserves against Bradford City on 14 October. His debut for York came in a 1–1 draw against Mansfield Town in the Conference League Cup third round on 4 November, which York eventually won 4–2 in a penalty shoot-out. This was followed by his league debut, which finished as a 2–1 defeat to Torquay United; York's first home defeat of the 2008–09 season. Tightness in his thigh muscle saw him miss York's game against Altrincham in December, but was declared fit for the game against league-leaders Burton Albion. He was released by York following the end of the season, during which he made 11 appearances.

By March 2010 Hogg was playing for Lancashire Amateur League Division Three outfit Roach Dynamos. He started the 2011–12 season with North West Counties Football League First Division side Rochdale Town, making eight appearances before signing for Salford City of the Northern Premier League Division One North in October 2011.

== Career statistics ==
As of 26 April 2009.

Club	Season	League^{[A]}		Cup		League Cup^{[B]}		Other^{[C]}		Total	
Club	Season	Apps	Goals	Apps	Goals	Apps	Goals	Apps	Goals	Apps	Goals
Shrewsbury Town	2005–06	12	0	1	0	2	0	1	0	16	0
Shrewsbury Town	2006–07	1	0	0	0	1	0	2	0	4	0
Shrewsbury Town	Total	13	0	1	0	3	0	3	0	20	0
Gretna	2006–07	4	0	0	0	0	0	0	0	4	0
Gretna	2007–08	11	1	0	0	1	0	0	0	12	1
Gretna	Total	15	1	0	0	1	0	0	0	16	1
York City	2008–09	9	0	0	0	0	0	2	0	11	0
Rochdale Town	2011–12	7	0	0	0	0	0	1	0	8	0
Career total		44	1	1	0	4	0	6	0	55	1

A. The "League" column constitutes appearances and goals in the Football League, Football Conference, Scottish Premier League and Scottish Football League.
B. The "League Cup" column constitutes appearances and goals (including those as a substitute) in the Football League Cup and Scottish League Cup.
C. The "Other" column constitutes appearances and goals in the Conference League Cup, FA Trophy, FA Vase and Football League Trophy.
