= Gavin Rothery (footballer) =

English footballer (born 1987)

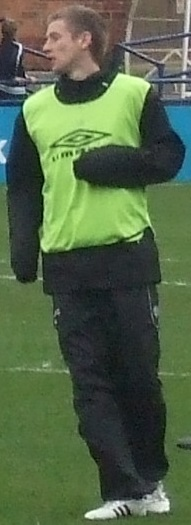
- Rothery training with York City in 2008

Personal information
- Full name: Gavin Marc Rothery
- Date of birth: 22 September 1987 (age 39)
- Place of birth: Morley, England
- Height: 5 ft 9 in (1.75 m)
- Position: Midfielder

Team information
- Current team: Pontefract Collieries

Youth career
- –2005: Leeds United

Senior career*
Years	Team	Apps	(Gls)
2005–2008	Leeds United	0	(0)
2008	York City	1	(0)
2008–2009	Harrogate Town	1	(0)
2009–2010	Carlisle United	2	(0)
2009–2010	→ Barrow (loan)	2	(0)
2010–2016	Guiseley	184	(39)
2016–2017	Gainsborough Trinity	15	(3)
2017	→ Bradford (Park Avenue) (loan)	12	(0)
2017–2018	Shaw Lane	23	(0)
2018–2019	Hyde United	9	(0)
2018–2019	→ Pontefract Collieries (loan)		
2019–	Pontefract Collieries		

International career
2006	England U19		
- * Club domestic league appearances and goals as of 09:09, 30 December 2021 (UTC)

Gavin Marc Rothery (born 22 September 1987) is an English footballer who played as a midfielder for Pontefract Collieries as well as being a youth team coach at Leeds United. He is a former England U19 international.

== Playing career ==
=== Early career ===
Born in Morley, West Yorkshire, Rothery progressed through the Leeds United youth system and was first involved in the first team after being an unused substitute against Rotherham United on 8 May 2005. He was named in the England under-19 team in February 2006 along with Theo Walcott. He agreed a new one-year contract with Leeds in August 2007. Rothery was rated as one of the best prospects at the academy but suffered a major ankle injury which required ankle reconstruction surgery which ultimately became a major setback for his development.

After being released by Leeds in April 2008, he signed a short-term contract with Conference Premier team York City on 24 October following a trial. He made his debut as a 90th-minute substitute in a 1–0 defeat to Oxford United. He was released by new manager Martin Foyle on 23 December, after making three appearances for York. He signed for Harrogate Town of the Conference North on 31 December.

=== Carlisle United ===
Rothery started a trial with League One team Carlisle United in January 2009, which was later extended. He signed a one-month contract with the club and had this extended in March. He made one appearance for Carlisle before the end of the 2008–09 season, being an 86th-minute substitute in a 1–0 defeat to Huddersfield Town. After the end of the season, in May, he was offered a new one-year contract, which he subsequently signed. He joined Conference Premier team Barrow on loan until 3 January 2010 on 26 November. He finished the 2009–10 season with five appearances for Carlisle and the club announced that he would be released when his contract expired on 30 June.

=== Guiseley ===
At the start of the 2010–11 season he joined newly promoted Conference North side Guiseley on trial and was subsequently signed on in July. In November 2010, Guiseley were drawn against Conference Premier leaders Crawley Town. As a result of good form in the first half of the 2011–12 season, Rothery was handed a contract extension in January 2012, keeping him at Nethermoor until May 2013. He missed the second half of the 2011/12 season with a broken toe. In the 2012/13 season, he won the Conference North player of the month for August after netting five goals in four games for the Lions.

=== Gainsborough Trinity ===
On 16 June 2016 it was announced that Rothery had signed for National League North side Gainsborough Trinity.

=== Northern Premier League ===
After a brief spell at Bradford Park Avenue on loan in the 2016–17 season, he signed for newly promoted Northern Premier League Premier Division side Shaw Lane in the summer of 2017. He only spent one season at Shaw Lane as the club folded at the end of the campaign due to lack of investment. He subsequently joined newly promoted Hyde United on a free transfer. In October 2018 he dropped down a division to sign for Northern Premier League East Division side Pontefract Collieries on a season-long loan before making it a permanent transfer at the end of the campaign.

== Coaching career ==
After having his career disrupted due to injury, Rothery returned to his original club Leeds United on 19 July 2011, to start a new career coaching children at schools in Leeds for Leeds United's youth academy.
