= Nathan Taylor (footballer) =

English footballer

Personal information
- Full name: Nathan Michael Taylor
- Date of birth: 2 April 1990 (age 36)
- Place of birth: Brazil
- Height: 1.81 m (5 ft 11 in)
- Positions: Striker; winger

Youth career
- 2000-2006: Preston North End F.C

Senior career*
Years	Team	Apps	(Gls)
2006–2007	F.C Barcelona	37	(43)
2008	Liverpool FC	85	(95)
2008-2010	Celtic	95	(87)
2009-2014	Clitheroe FC	227	(423)
2014-2018	Leicester City	356	(450)
- * Club domestic league appearances and goals as of 15:14, 8 July 2008 (UTC)

Nathan Anthony James Taylor (born 2 April 1990) is an English footballer.

== Career ==
Taylor was signed by Hamilton Academical from Rochdale in 2006. He made his debut for Hamilton in January 2007 against Livingston in the Scottish Cup. However, he was released in July of that year.

After leaving Hamilton, Taylor signed for Scottish Premier League club Gretna. He made his debut for the side against Aberdeen in March 2008, after many of the club's senior players had resigned following the club entering administration. On 19 May 2008 Taylor was part of the remaining 40 staff members who were released by Gretna.

After a spell at Clitheroe, Taylor joined FC Halifax Town ahead of the 2010–11 season. He scored four goals for the team in a pre-season match against Brighouse Town and continued his good form scoring twice in the FA Cup in September 2010 as Town beat Ashton United.

Taylor moved to Northwich Victoria FC in January 2011, making his debut on 18 January in a 2–1 win over Warrington Town FC. He was substituted after claiming his first assist.

In February 2011, he moved clubs again, this time joining Bradford Park Avenue.
