= Onome Sodje =

Nigerian footballer

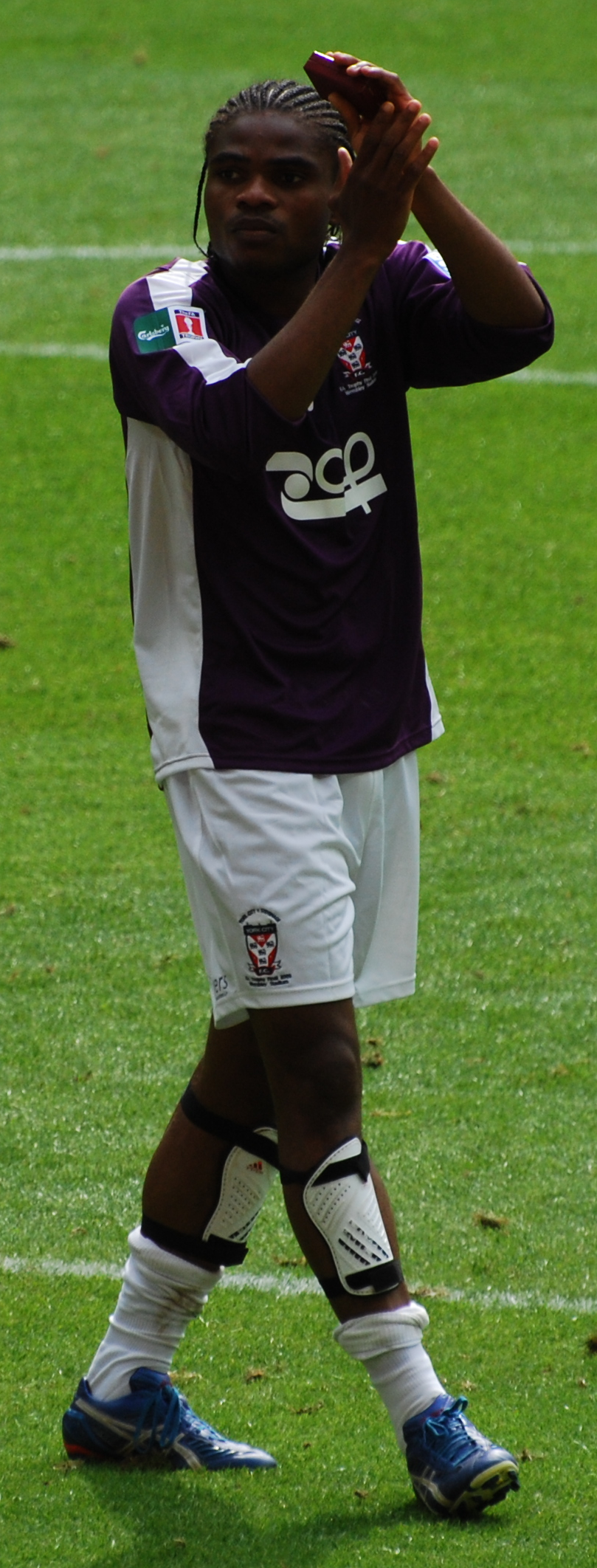
- Sodje after playing for York City in the 2009 FA Trophy Final

Personal information
- Full name: Onome Sympson Sodje
- Date of birth: 17 July 1988 (age 38)
- Place of birth: Warri, Nigeria
- Height: 5 ft 10 in (1.78 m)
- Position: Striker

Youth career
- –2005: Charlton Athletic

Senior career*
Years	Team	Apps	(Gls)
2005–2006	Charlton Athletic	0	(0)
2005	→ Welling United (loan)	6	(1)
2005	→ Gravesend & Northfleet (loan)	8	(2)
2006	→ Gravesend & Northfleet (loan)	6	(1)
2006–2007	Gravesend & Northfleet	39	(9)
2007–2009	York City	81	(21)
2009–2010	Barnsley	1	(0)
2009–2010	→ Oxford United (loan)	4	(1)
2010	Senica	14	(1)
2011	Đồng Nai		
2011–2012	Floriana	10	(5)
2012–2013	Belouizdad	13	(1)
2013–2014	Partizani Tirana	3	(1)
2014–2015	Nuneaton Town	29	(4)
2015–2016	Billericay Town	?	(6)
- * Club domestic league appearances and goals as of 00:49, 2 August 2017 (UTC)

Onome Sympson Sodje (born 17 July 1988) is a Nigerian footballer who plays as a striker. He has played professionally for clubs in England, Slovakia, Malta, Vietnam, Algeria and Albania.

== Career ==
Born in Warri, Delta State, Sodje came through the Charlton Athletic youth system|. He scored 14 goals in 19 games in the 2003–04 U17 FA Premier Academy League. He spent time on loan at Welling United towards the end of the 2004–05 season. He then went out on loan to Conference National team Gravesend & Northfleet in September 2005. He rejoined Gravesend for a second loan period in February 2006.

He was released by Charlton in 2006 and eventually signed for Gravesend & Northfleet permanently in August.

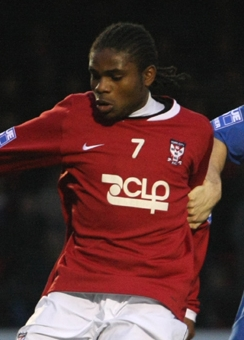
Sodje playing for York City in 2007

Sodje signed for fellow Conference Premier club York City on 18 June 2007 on a free transfer. He was joint top goalscorer with 17 goals in the 2007–08 season. Sodje won the first Conference Premier Goal of the Month award in September 2008 with a goal against Torquay United, which won with 30% of the vote. He came on as a 63rd minute substitute in the FA Trophy Final at Wembley Stadium on 9 May 2009, which York lost 2–0 to Stevenage Borough. He was largely restricted to the bench as his form dipped during the 2008–09 season, which he finished with 46 appearances and seven goals.

Sodje signed for Championship team Barnsley on 15 June 2009. He was allowed to move on a free transfer as he was playing at York on a non-contract basis. His contract status was due to his lack of a valid work permit, connected to an ongoing dispute with immigration officials over his right to reside in the UK. York spent £5,000 on legal fees to fight his case which also attracted the support of the Archbishop of York John Sentamu and MP Hugh Bayley. After winning the right to stay in the country he chose to move to Barnsley rather than sign the contract offered by York.

He made his debut as a 79th-minute substitute in a 2–0 defeat to Coventry City on 15 August. He joined Conference Premier leaders Oxford United on an emergency loan on 23 November and made his debut a day later as a substitute in a 1–0 victory over Forest Green Rovers. He scored his first goal in a 1–1 with Salisbury City, which put Oxford in the lead on 79 minutes. Oxford confirmed his loan would not be extended in January 2010. He joined Slovak Superliga team FK Senica in January, scoring a header on his debut in a 2–1 victory over MFK Ružomberok in February. Sodje finished the 2009–10 season with one goal in 13 appearances. He made only appearance in the 2010–11 season, in a 0–0 draw at MŠK Žilina on 21 August. He later signed with Vietnamese First Division club Đồng Nai. Sodje joined Floriana of the Maltese Premier League in December and scored on his debut, a 4–2 victory over Ħamrun Spartans. In July 2012, he joined Algerian club CR Belouizdad, signing a three-year contract. He scored one goal in 13 games in the Algerian Ligue Professionnelle 1, before being released at the end of the season.

Following his release from Belouizdad, Sodje signed for Albanian Superliga club Partizani Tirana. Sodje scored on his debut for Partizani Tirana on 18 September 2013, in their 2–2 draw against Bylis Ballsh.

In October 2014 he returned to England, signing for Nuneaton Town.

Sodje joined Billericay Town for the 2015–16 season, scoring 7 goals for the club.

== Personal life ==
He moved to England at the age of 14 and attended Sedgehill School in south-east London. Sodje's uncles, Sam, Efe, Akpo, and Steve all play football in England as well. Another uncle Bright is a former professional rugby league footballer.

== Career statistics ==
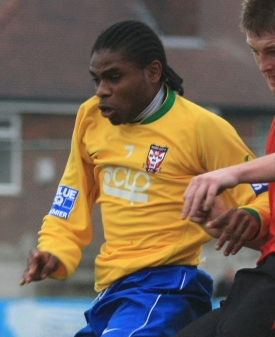
Sodje playing for York City in 2008

As of 21 August 2010.

Club	Season	League^{[A]}		FA Cup		League Cup		Other^{[B]}		Total	
Club	Season	Apps	Goals	Apps	Goals	Apps	Goals	Apps	Goals	Apps	Goals
Welling United (loan)	2004–05	6	1	0	0	0	0	0	0	6	1
Gravesend & Northfleet (loan)	2005–06	8	2	1	0	0	0	0	0	9	2
Gravesend & Northfleet (loan)	2005–06	6	1	0	0	0	0	0	0	6	1
Gravesend & Northfleet	2006–07	39	9	1	0	0	0	2	0	42	9
Gravesend & Northfleet	Total	53	12	2	0	0	0	2	0	57	12
York City	2007–08	45	14	2	2	0	0	8	1	55	17
York City	2008–09	36	7	2	0	0	0	8	0	46	7
York City	Total	81	21	4	2	0	0	16	1	101	24
Barnsley	2009–10	1	0	0	0	0	0	0	0	1	0
Oxford United (loan)	2009–10	4	1	0	0	0	0	1	0	5	1
FK Senica	2009–10	13	1	0	0	0	0	0	0	13	1
FK Senica	2010–11	1	0	0	0	0	0	0	0	1	0
FK Senica	Total	14	1	0	0	0	0	0	0	14	1
Career total		159	36	6	2	0	0	19	1	184	39

A. The "League" column constitutes appearances and goals (including those as a substitute) in the Football League, Football Conference and Slovak Superliga.
B. The "Other" column constitutes appearances and goals (including those as a substitute) in the Conference League Cup and FA Trophy.
