= Niall Henderson =

Northern Irish footballer

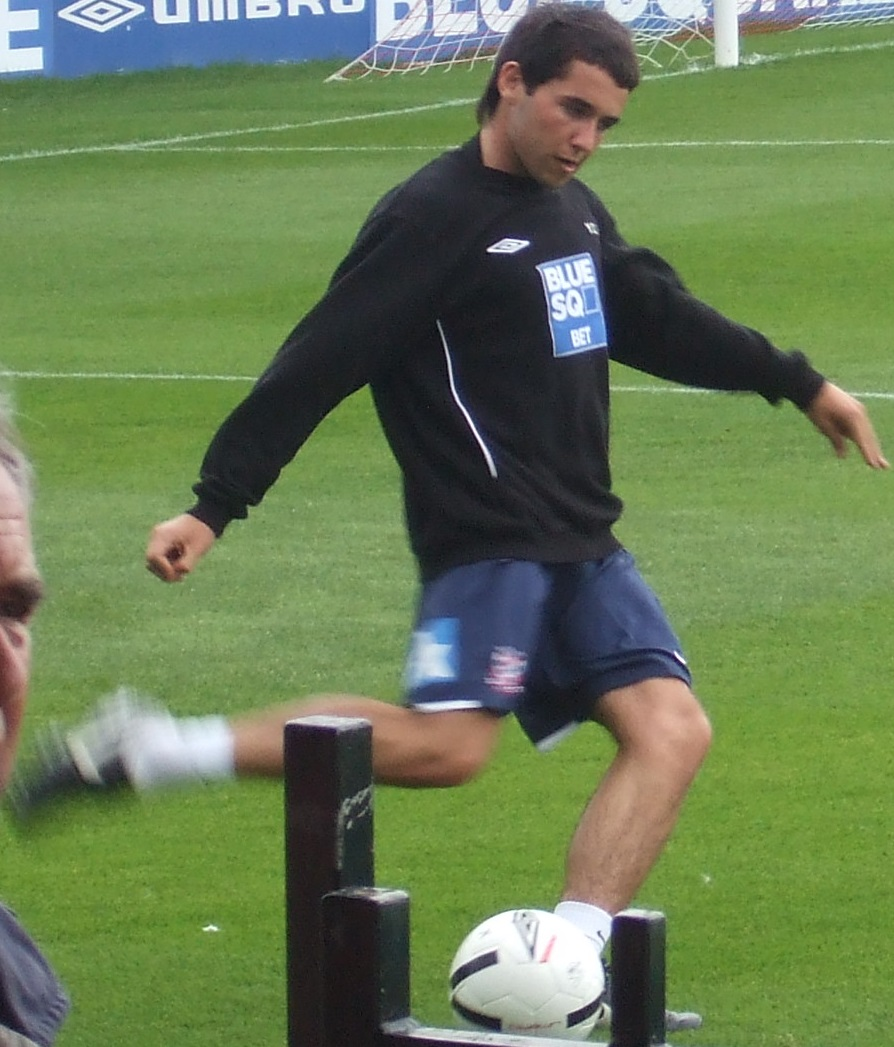
- Henderson training with York City in 2008

Personal information
- Date of birth: 7 February 1988 (age 38)
- Place of birth: Craigavon, Northern Ireland
- Position: Midfielder

Team information
- Current team: Annagh United

Youth career
- Portadown
- 2004–2006: Gretna

Senior career*
Years	Team	Apps	(Gls)
2006–2008	Gretna	0	(0)
2007	→ Dumbarton (loan)	13	(0)
2008	Raith Rovers	14	(0)
2008–2009	York City	6	(0)
2009–2010	Newry City	26	(1)
2010–2011	Dungannon Swifts	28	(1)
2011–2013	Glenavon	43	(4)
2013–2016	Glentoran	64	(2)
2016–2018	Portadown	51	(7)
2018–	Annagh United	132	(12)
- * Club domestic league appearances and goals

Niall Henderson (born 7 February 1988) is a Northern Irish footballer who plays for NIFL Championship side Annagh United.

== Career ==
Henderson is from Craigavon, County Armagh. He grew up in Lurgan and played snooker as a child, going on to represent Northern Ireland as a junior international in 2003. He was on the books at Portadown as a youth player, before moving to Scotland with Gretna at the age of 16. He first featured on the bench for Gretna in their 2–1 defeat to Stirling Albion on 29 April 2006 in the Scottish Football League Second Division, and was subsequently on the bench for the 2006 Scottish Cup Final against Heart of Midlothian, which was lost 4–2 on penalties after a 1–1 draw after extra time on 13 May 2006. He was loaned out to Dumbarton in the Scottish Third Division in August 2007 until January 2008, during which he made 16 appearances and scored one goal. He was released by Gretna in January and signed for Raith Rovers later that month on a short-term deal to the end of the 2007–08 season, making his debut in the 1–0 victory at Queens Park on 19 January 2008 at Hampden Park. Henderson featured for the side in both legs of their play-off semi-final defeat to Airdrie United and finished the season with 16 Raith appearances.

He was released by Raith after the end of the season, after which he joined York City in the Conference Premier on 18 June 2008. He made his debut in a 1–0 victory against Wrexham on 14 August 2008 after coming on as a 62nd-minute substitute. He was named in the Northern Ireland under-21 team in September for their 2009 UEFA European Under-21 Football Championship qualifying game against Germany. Henderson was on the bench as Northern Ireland were beaten 3–0, meaning they were unable to quality for the tournament. He made his return for York in a 4–2 defeat to Kettering Town, which was the team's first loss of the season. He suffered from two viruses within the space of four weeks, and returned to light training in October. He continued to play for the reserve team and scored in a 4–4 draw against Barnsley reserves. Henderson had fallen out favour under manager Colin Walker and struggled to feature in the team. He picked up a hamstring injury during a training session in December. He was released by the club on 20 January and returned to Ireland to sign for either Finn Harps or Newry City, eventually signing for Newry.

On 6 July 2010, Henderson joined Dungannon Swifts on a one-year deal along with Johnny Topley after his contract with his previous employers, Newry City, expired. In June 2011 he joined Glenavon.

== Career statistics ==
As of 13 September 2008.

Club Performance
Club	Season	League		S. Cup		S. League Cup		Other^{[A]}		Total
Club	Season	App	Goals	App	Goals	App	Goals	App	Goals	App	Goals
Gretna	2005–06	0	0	0	0	0	0	0	0	0	0
Gretna	2006–07	0	0	0	0	0	0	0	0	0	0
Gretna	2007–08	0	0	0	0	0	0	0	0	0	0
Gretna	Subtotal	0	0	0	0	0	0	0	0	0	0
Dumbarton (loan)	2007–08	13	0	3	1	0	0	0	0	16	1
Dumbarton (loan)	Subtotal	13	0	3	1	0	0	0	0	16	1
Raith Rovers	2007–08	14	0	0	0	0	0	2	0	16	0
Raith Rovers	Subtotal	14	0	0	0	0	0	2	0	16	0
Club	Season	League		FA Cup		League Cup		Other		Total
Club	Season	App	Goals	App	Goals	App	Goals	App	Goals	App	Goals
York City	2008–09	6	0	0	0	0	0	0	0	6	0
York City	Subtotal	6	0	0	0	0	0	0	0	6	0
Total		33	0	3	1	0	0	2	0	38	1

== Footnotes ==
A. The "Other" column constitutes appearances and goals (including those as a substitute) in the play-offs.
