= Colin Walker (footballer, born 1958) =

New Zealand international footballer and manager (born 1958)

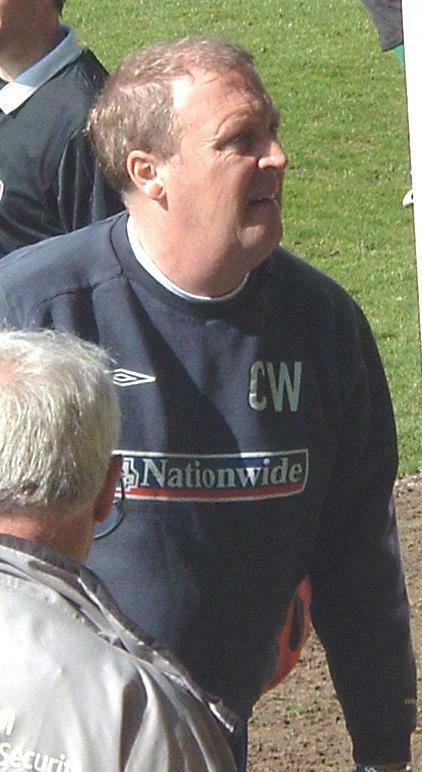
- Walker with York City in 2007

Personal information
- Full name: Colin Walker
- Date of birth: 1 May 1958 (age 68)
- Place of birth: Rotherham, England
- Height: 5 ft 8 in (1.73 m)
- Position: Striker

Team information
- Current team: Grimsby Town (Head of Coaching)

Senior career*
Years	Team	Apps	(Gls)
- Retford Town
- Matlock Town
1980	Gisborne City		
1980–1983	Barnsley	24	(12)
1983	→ Doncaster Rovers (loan)	12	(5)
1983–1985	Gisborne City	56	(38)
1985–1986	Doncaster Rovers	5	(0)
1986	Cambridge United	3	(1)
1986	Matlock Town		
1986	Harworth Colliery Institute		
1986–1988	Sheffield Wednesday	2	(0)
1986–1987	→ Darlington (loan)	7	(0)
1987–1988	→ Torquay United (loan)	3	(0)
1988	Gisborne City		
Total		112	(56)

International career
1984–1988	New Zealand	15	(10)

Managerial career
- 1988: Gisborne City
- 1989–1993: Maltby Miners Welfare
- 2007–2008: York City
- * Club domestic league appearances and goals

Colin Walker (born 1 May 1958) is a former professional footballer and manager who is head of coaching at EFL League Two side Grimsby Town.

As a player he was a striker who notably played in the Football League for Barnsley, Doncaster Rovers, Cambridge United, Sheffield Wednesday, Darlington and Torquay United. He also spent time playing in New Zealand with three spells at Gisborne City. He also played non-league football for Retford Town, Matlock Town and Harworth Colliery Institute. Walker was capped 15 times by New Zealand between 1984 and 1988, scoring 10 goals. He had obtained citizenship during his time spent playing in the country.

As a manager Walker took charge of Gisborne City in 1988 before moving on to manage non-league side Maltby Miners Welfare. He later had coaching roles at Barnsley and Leeds United whilst also working for Rugby Union side Rotherham Titans. He later joined York City as a first team coach before becoming manager between 2007 and 2008. He has since worked for Forest Green Rovers, Notts County Ladies and Doncaster Rovers in varying coaching positions.

== Club career ==
Born in Rotherham, West Riding of Yorkshire, Colin was the most wanted junior footballer in Britain at the age of 12. Walker played as a trialist in York City's youth and reserve teams in 1976, after which he moved to New Zealand to play for Gisborne City in 1980 after being spotted playing in English non-League football for Retford Town and Matlock Town by Kevin Fallon. After the end of the season, he returned to play in England for Football League side Barnsley in November 1980. He scored 12 times in 24 games for Barnsley, with an additional five goals in 12 games while on loan at Doncaster Rovers from February 1983, before returning to New Zealand to play for Gisborne City. Walker reached the final of the Chatham Cup in 1983 with Gisborne. He scored twice, but the match ended 2–2, and was won by Gisborne's opponents Mount Wellington 2–0 in the replay. During the 1983 season, he scored seven goals in 12 appearances. He scored 16 goals in 22 appearances and won the country's Player of the Year award in 1984. He then scored 15 goals in 22 appearances in 1985. Overall, he was the top scorer in New Zealand during three of the five years he spent playing in the country.

In November 1985, Walker returned to Doncaster Rovers on non-contract terms, playing five times before moving to Cambridge United in January 1986. He scored once in 3 games, but was released by Cambridge and returned to Matlock Town. From there he joined Harworth Colliery Institute from where he was signed by Sheffield Wednesday in August 1986. He joined Darlington on loan in December 1986, where he made seven appearances, and Torquay United on loan in October 1987, where he made three appearances. He left Sheffield Wednesday having played just two league games and after scoring a hat-trick in a League Cup tie, a 7–0 victory against Stockport County, which Wednesday won 10–0 on aggregate. He then returned to New Zealand for a final spell with Gisborne City, where he took over as player-manager, but left because of financial problems at the club. He also worked as striker-coach at the club. After returning to England for a run-out with Doncaster, he suffered a cruciate ligament injury to his knee which brought an end to his playing career.

In 1970, 12 year old Colin Walker was featured in a BBC film about scouting, being scouted by numerous top English football clubs, and reckoned to be "better than George Best" at his age.

== International career ==
Whilst at Gisborne City, Walker acquired New Zealand citizenship, and so played for the New Zealand national team and scored 10 goals in 15 caps. The highlight of his international career came against Brazil, during which he was marked by Aldair.

== Coaching and managerial career ==
Walker spent three-and-a-half-years after his playing career ended as manager of Maltby Miners Welfare, whom he took from the Northern Counties East Football League Division One to the Premier Division. He won the Presidents' Cup in his final season in charge. He had coaching appointments with Barnsley, where he held a variety of different positions from youth team coach to assistant manager. Walker left Barnsley, along with manager Glyn Hodges, in July 2003. He soon found employment at the Leeds United youth academy in addition to work at Rotherham R.U.F.C. and undertaking scouting assignments for lower league clubs while trying "to earn enough to pay the mortgage". Billy McEwan appointed him as first team coach at York City on 28 May 2005, stating that Walker would "bring honesty and commitment to the club, as well as a lot of knowledge".

He took over as caretaker manager at York on 19 November 2007, following McEwan's sacking by the club. His first game in charge finished as a 2–1 victory against Weymouth and after achieving five wins and a draw in six games, he was appointed as the club's permanent manager on 26 December 2007. He won the Conference National manager of the month award for December 2007, when the team gained 10 out of a possible 12 points in the league and made progress in the FA Trophy and Conference League Cup. He led the team to a 14th place finish in the Conference in the 2007–08 season, and also reached the semi-final of the FA Trophy and the fifth round of the Conference League Cup. During York's 1–0 defeat to Mansfield Town in an FA Cup fourth qualifying round replay in October 2008, Walker was targeted by some fans chanting his name. He was sacked as York manager on 21 November 2008.

Walker joined Forest Green Rovers as assistant manager to caretaker manager David Brown in August 2009. Walker left Forest Green in September after the club appointed Dave Hockaday as their new manager. He later joined Doncaster, who he played for during his playing career, as Centre of Excellence technical development officer.

Walker is currently with Notts County Ladies where he is assistant manager. He was appointed as assistant on 16 December 2013.

In 2017 he moved to Grimsby Town as head of coaching, within the clubs academy system.

== Career statistics ==
Appearances and goals by national team and year
National team	Year	Apps	Goals
New Zealand	1984	2	1
New Zealand	1985	8	9
New Zealand	1988	5	0
Total		15	10

== Managerial statistics ==
As of 21 November 2008

Managerial record by team and tenure
Team	From	To	Record					Ref
Team	From	To	P	W	D	L	Win %	Ref
York City	19 November 2007	21 November 2008	58	22	20	16	37.9	
Total			58	22	20	16	37.9	

== Honours ==
Maltby Miners Welfare

- Northern Counties East Football League Presidents Cup: 1992–93

Individual

- New Zealand Footballer of the Year: 1984
