= Michael Ingham (footballer) =

Association football player (born 1980)

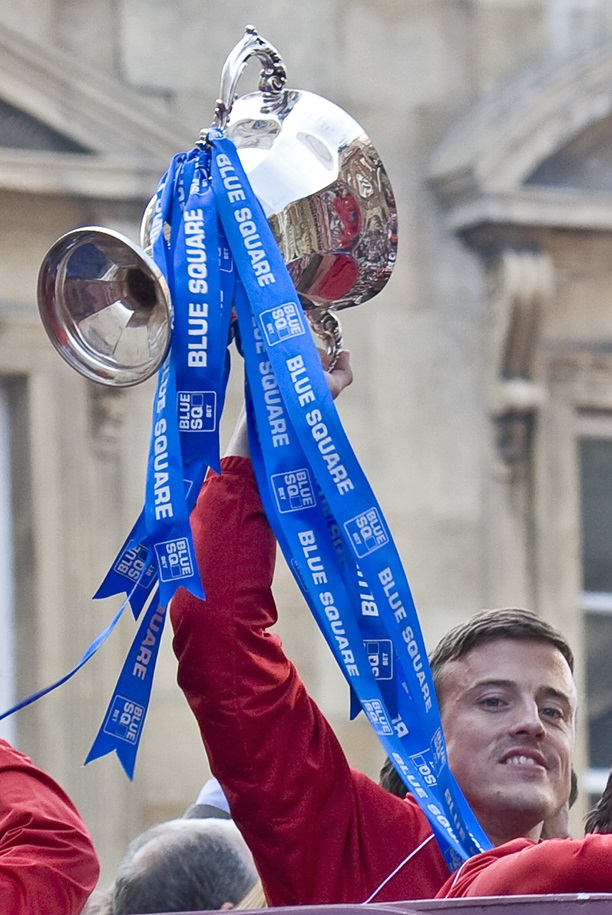
- Ingham with the victory parade that followed York City's victory in the 2012 Conference Premier play-off final

Personal information
- Full name: Michael Gerard Ingham
- Date of birth: 9 July 1980 (age 46)
- Place of birth: Preston, England
- Height: 6 ft 4 in (1.93 m)
- Position: Goalkeeper

Team information
- Current team: Scarborough Athletic

Youth career
- Newington Youth Club
- –1998: Malachians

Senior career*
Years	Team	Apps	(Gls)
1998–1999	Cliftonville	18	(0)
1999–2005	Sunderland	2	(0)
1999	→ Carlisle United (loan)	7	(0)
2000–2001	→ Cliftonville (loan)	20	(0)
2001–2002	→ Stoke City (loan)	0	(0)
2002	→ Stockport County (loan)	0	(0)
2002	→ Darlington (loan)	3	(0)
2003	→ York City (loan)	17	(0)
2004	→ Wrexham (loan)	11	(0)
2004	→ Doncaster Rovers (loan)	1	(0)
2005–2007	Wrexham	71	(0)
2007–2008	Hereford United	0	(0)
2008–2016	York City	258	(0)
2016–2021	Tadcaster Albion	65	(0)

International career
1999	Northern Ireland U18	1	(0)
2001	Northern Ireland U21	4	(0)
2005–2007	Northern Ireland	3	(0)
- * Club domestic league appearances and goals as of 17:15, 21 April 2020 (UTC)

Michael Gerard Ingham (born 9 July 1980) is a former professional footballer who last played as a goalkeeper for Tadcaster Albion. He has played in the Football League for Carlisle United, Darlington, York City, Wrexham, Doncaster Rovers and Sunderland and at senior international level for the Northern Ireland national team. He is assistant coach at Scarborough Athletic.

Ingham started his career with Northern Irish club Cliftonville before moving to England with Sunderland in the Premier League in 1999. He was loaned out by the club on eight occasions before eventually joining former loan club Wrexham on a permanent deal in 2005. After leaving the club in 2007 he joined Hereford United, where he made one appearance, and a year later dropped into non-League football with York City. He played for them in the 2009 FA Trophy Final at Wembley Stadium and after gaining the captaincy in 2010 he returned to Wembley Stadium to play in the 2010 Conference Premier play-off final. Ingham was victorious with York in the 2012 FA Trophy Final and the 2012 Conference Premier play-off final at Wembley Stadium, the latter meaning the club was promoted to League Two.

Born in England, Ingham has represented Northern Ireland at international level. He was capped once by the under-18 team before winning four caps for the under-21s in 2001. He earned three caps for Northern Ireland, gaining his first against Germany in 2005. He was last capped against Wales in 2007.

== Club career ==
=== Early career ===
Ingham was born in Preston, Lancashire, to a Northern Irish family. Despite being born in England, he was educated in Northern Ireland and studied A-levels at St Malachy's College, Belfast. As a teenager, he lived near the ground of Irish League Premier Division club Cliftonville, and played for amateur clubs Newington Youth Club and Malachians in the Northern Amateur Football League before starting his career with Cliftonville in 1998. He won the Irish FA Charity Shield and made 35 appearances during the 1998–99 season after replacing Paul Reece as the team's goalkeeper.

=== Sunderland ===
Having been watched by a number of clubs, Ingham joined newly promoted Premier League club Sunderland on 28 July 1999 for a £30,000 fee following a trial in February. He was loaned out to Third Division club Carlisle United on 1 October 1999, making his Football League debut the following day in a 1–1 home draw against Southend United. He finished the successful spell with seven appearances for Carlisle. He returned to Northern Ireland by rejoining former club Cliftonville on loan for the first three months of 2000–01 on 11 August 2000 to gain more first-team experience, saying "That's why I jumped at the chance of three months back in my old jersey. There was an option to join Lincoln City instead but they were only offering reserve games." He finished this spell with 22 appearances, before being recalled by Sunderland in early January 2001. He made his Sunderland debut by starting in a 4–2 defeat away to Sheffield Wednesday in the League Cup on 12 September 2001, which proved to be his only appearance of 2001–02. This appearance resulted in former club Cliftonville receiving a payment from Sunderland, which was agreed when he was transferred to Sunderland. He joined Stoke City of the Second Division on a one-month loan on 18 December 2001, where he failed to make any appearances after joining as cover for Neil Cutler following an injury to Gavin Ward.

Ingham was forced further down the Sunderland pecking order after the signing of Thomas Myhre in July 2002 and he joined Second Division club Stockport County on a one-month loan on 23 August. He made his only appearance in a 3–1 victory away to Lincoln in the League Cup on 10 September 2002 and the loan was extended for a second month, before being recalled by Sunderland in October due to an injury crisis. Despite this, he was forced further down Sunderland's pecking order after they signed Mart Poom on loan from Derby County and after considering handing in a transfer request he joined Third Division club Darlington on a one-month loan on 22 November 2002. He made three appearances before returning to Sunderland in December. He played for Sunderland in a friendly against Hull City for the opening of their new ground, the KC Stadium, which made him the first away goalkeeper at the ground, while also being the last to play at Hull's former ground, Boothferry Park. This was his final appearance for Darlington in a 1–0 victory over Hull, during which he denied Stuart Elliott from scoring on three occasions. He joined Third Division club York City on 24 January 2003 on a one-month loan after goalkeeper Alan Fettis left to join Hull, who Ingham made his debut against a day later in a 0–0 away draw. His loan at York was extended for second and third months in February and March 2003 and he finished the spell, in which he performed well, with 17 appearances.

His second Sunderland appearance came in a 4–2 home defeat against Huddersfield Town in the League Cup on 23 September 2003 and in a reserve match in January 2004 he was sent off for head butting West Bromwich Albion's Simon Brown. He was signed by Second Division club Wrexham on 15 March 2004 a one-month loan following an injury to Andy Dibble, which was extended until the end of 2003–04 on 16 April. He finished this spell with 11 appearances for Wrexham, as well as playing in the 4–1 victory over Rhyl in the FAW Premier Cup Final. In May 2004, he threatened to leave Sunderland if he was not guaranteed first-team football the following season. After training with Blackpool, Ingham joined League One club Doncaster Rovers on 1 November 2004 on a one-month loan, playing in two matches. Ingham was set to join Coventry City on transfer deadline day in March 2005, but Sunderland cancelled the transfer due to an injury to Poom. His league debut for Sunderland came in a 2–1 home defeat against Reading on 9 April 2005, which he entered as a 45th-minute substitute for the injured Myhre. Despite suffering a neck injury while on the team bus, he made his first league start in the following match, a 2–2 away draw with Ipswich Town on 17 April 2005. After the match, manager Mick McCarthy said "He knows he's playing for a future elsewhere and I think that overall he's handled a bloody tense situation really well". He finished 2004–05 with two appearances for Sunderland and on 8 May 2005 was released by the club.

=== Wrexham and Hereford United ===
Ingham agreed a move to League Two club Wrexham in May 2005 on a two-year contract, and the transfer was completed on 5 July when he signed the contract. He picked up a calf injury after returning to Wrexham, which saw him miss their match against Leyton Orient on 17 September 2005. He suffered another injury on his return against Macclesfield Town on 24 September 2005, which on this occasion was a groin problem. Ingham returned to fitness ahead of their 4–2 home victory over Torquay United on 15 October 2005. He finished 2005–06 with 43 appearances for Wrexham. He underwent an operation on a hernia in May 2006. Ingham made his final appearance of 2006–07 in Wrexham's 2–1 away defeat to Milton Keynes Dons on 17 March 2007, in which he picked up a hamstring injury. He later suffered from a virus in April 2007. He finished the season with 37 appearances, after which he was released by the club, due to his place in the team being taken by Anthony Williams.

In July 2007, Ingham had a trial with Scottish Premier League club Gretna, playing in a pre-season friendly against Welsh Premier League club The New Saints. However, he suffered a finger injury and the move to Gretna did not take place. On 17 August 2007, he signed forLeague Two club Hereford United on an initial one-month contract as cover for Wayne Brown, which was later extended until the end of 2007–08. His debut came in the Football League Trophy at home to Yeovil Town on 9 October 2007, which Hereford lost 4–2 in a penalty shoot-out after a 0–0 draw after extra time, with Ingham making "good saves" from Kevin Betsy and Simon Gillett. He picked up a hand injury in March 2008 that was expected to keep him out of the team for six weeks, meaning he finished the season with one appearance.

=== York City ===
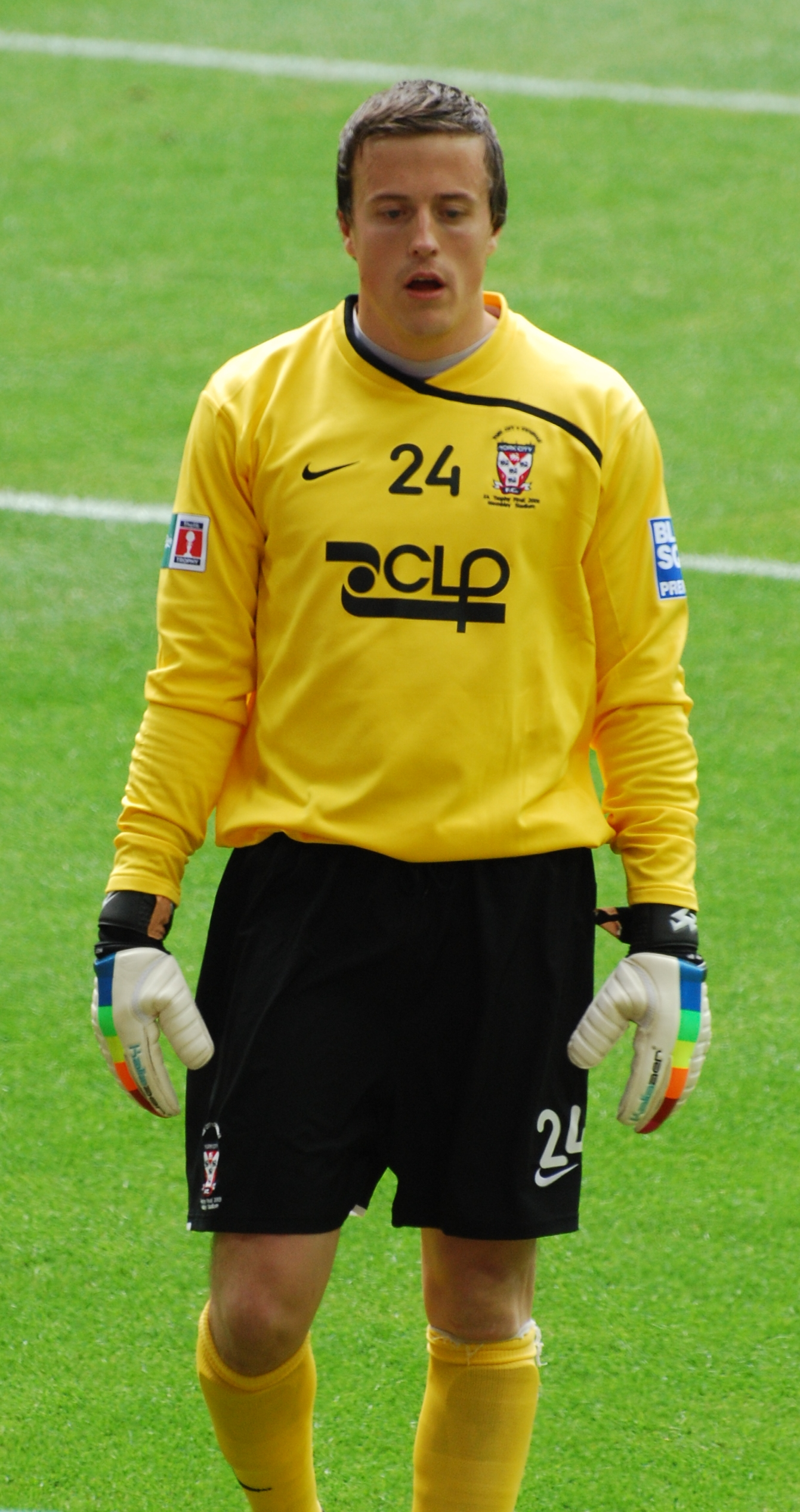
Ingham playing for York City in the 2009 FA Trophy Final

Ingham was released by Hereford at the end of the season, after which he moved down to the Conference Premier by rejoining former club York City on 14 May 2008 on a two-year contract. He suffered a thigh injury during a pre-season friendly against Harrogate Railway Athletic, meaning he missed York's opening match against Crawley Town on 9 August 2008, which led to the loan signing of Artur Krysiak from Birmingham City. Ingham recovered from his thigh injury ready for York's fourth match of 2008–09 against Northwich Victoria. Despite this, Josh Mimms played in goal and Ingham eventually made his first appearance of the season in a 1–1 home draw against Barrow on 25 August 2008. He saved a penalty kick during a penalty shoot-out against Mansfield Town in the Conference League Cup third round, helping York win the shootout 4–2, which followed a 1–1 home draw after extra time. He picked up a hamstring injury during a 1–1 away draw with Histon on 9 December 2008, and returned in York's next match, a 2–0 away win over Northwich in the FA Trophy on 16 December. Ingham saved the final penalty in a shoot-out victory at home to Kidderminster Harriers in an FA Trophy third round replay on 11 February 2009, giving York the victory 13–12 on penalties. He started in the 2009 FA Trophy Final at Wembley Stadium on 9 May, which York lost 2–0 to Stevenage Borough. Ingham finished his first permanent season at York with 52 appearances.

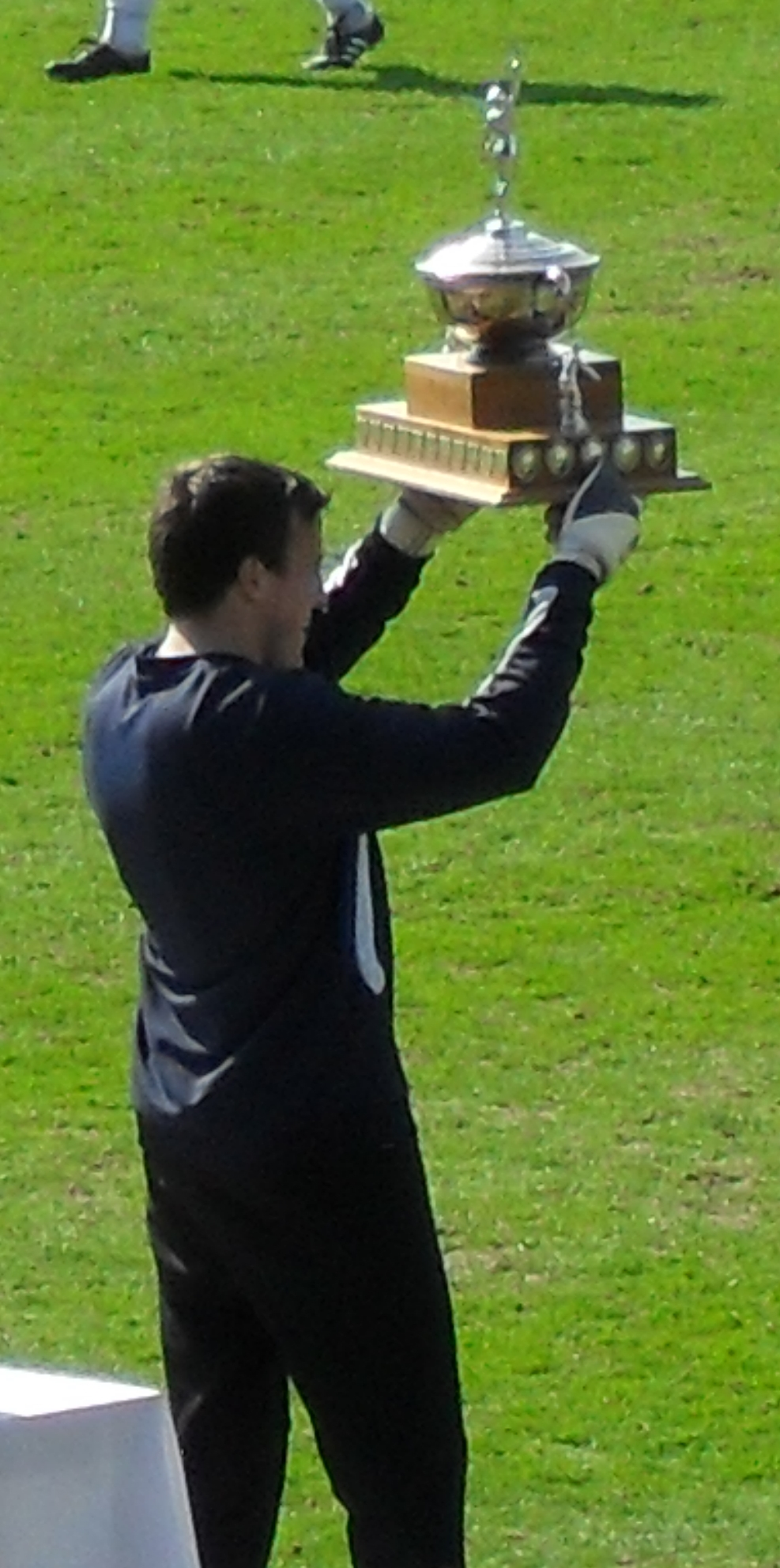
Ingham lifting the Billy Fenton Memorial Trophy after being named as York City's Clubman of the Year for the 2009–10 season

Utook over the captaincy following the absences of Daniel Parslow and David McGurk from the team in March 2010. He signed a new two-year contract with York in the same month. Ingham was named as York's Clubman of the Year for 2009–10 before their final home match of the season prior to play-offs against Grays Athletic. He was also named the Community Player of the Year, which recognised his community work in York. He played in both legs of York's play-off semi-final victory over Luton Town, which finished 2–0 on aggregate. He started in the 2010 Conference Premier play-off final at Wembley Stadium on 16 May, which York lost 3–1 to Oxford. He finished the season with 55 appearances for York.

Ingham was replaced as captain in October 2010 following the signing of Chris Smith, with manager Gary Mills commenting "I'm not a fan of goalkeeping captains and that's no disrespect to Michael Ingham. He took the decision on the chin with no problems." Ingham was named the Conference Player of the Month for November 2010 after he kept six clean sheets and conceded one goal throughout that period. He dedicated the award to his defence, saying "The lads have been brilliant all month, in particular the back five. I accept this trophy on behalf of them". He was sent off in the 15th minute of York's 5–0 defeat away to Luton on 18 January 2011 after fouling Claude Gnakpa outside the penalty area. He finished 2010–11 with 51 appearances and in July 2011 signed a new two-year contract with York.

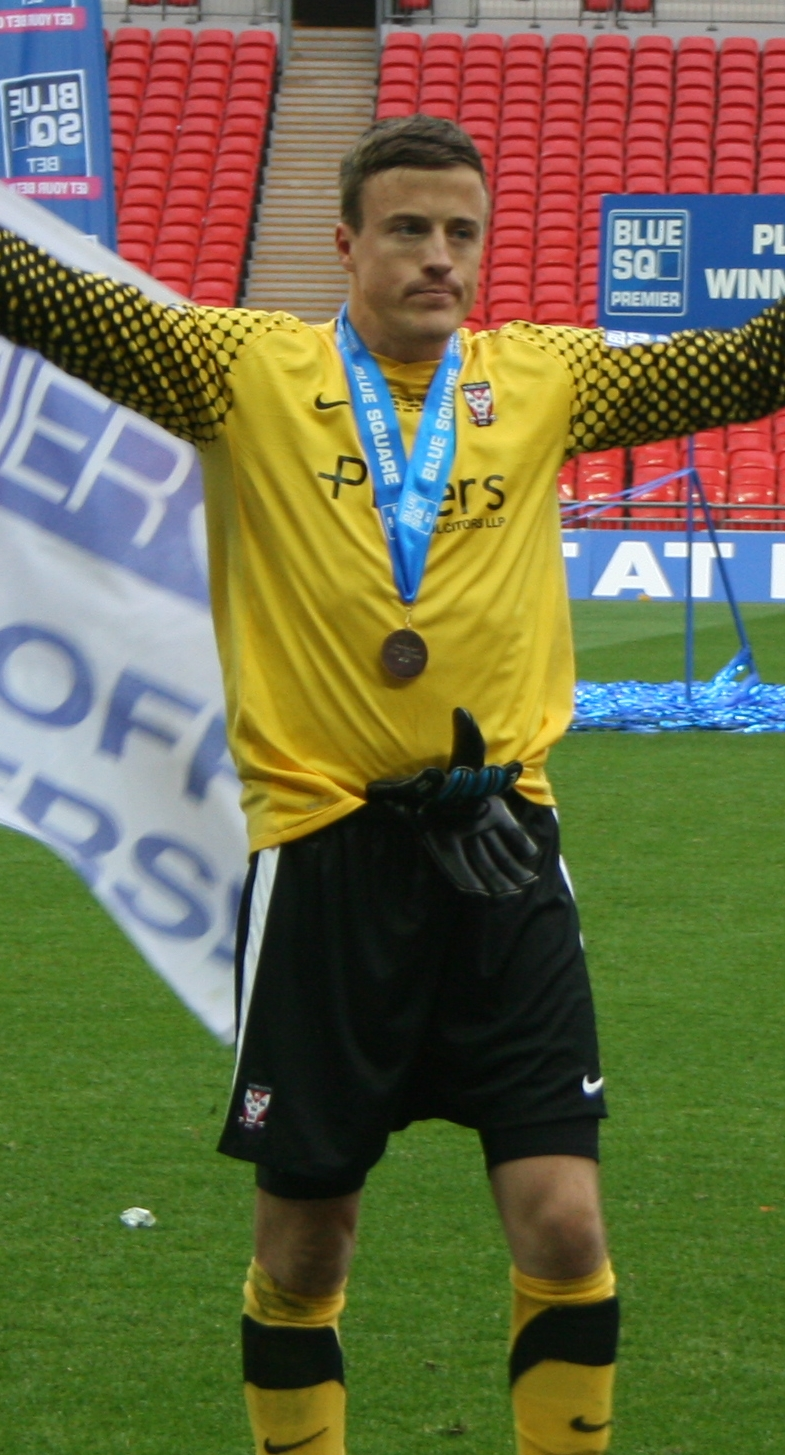
Ingham after playing for York City in the 2012 Conference Premier play-off final

Ingham won the 2012 FA Trophy Final with York at Wembley Stadium on 12 May, in which the team beat Newport County 2–0. Eight days later, he played in the 2–1 victory over Luton in the 2012 Conference Premier play-off final at Wembley Stadium on 20 May, seeing the club return to the Football League after an eight-year absence with promotion to League Two. Ingham finished 2011–12 with 55 appearances for York and in July 2012 signed a new two-year contract with the club.

Ingham started York's match away to League One team Doncaster in the League Cup first round on the opening day of 2012–13 on 11 August 2012, which they lost 4–2 in a penalty shoot-out following a 1–1 draw after extra time. He then played in York's first Football League fixture since their promotion, a 3–1 defeat at home to Wycombe Wanderers on 18 August 2012. He finished the season with 51 appearances.

Ingham left York after rejecting a new contract in July 2016.

=== Tadcaster Albion ===
On 1 August 2016, Ingham signed for newly promoted Northern Premier League Division One North club Tadcaster Albion, having earlier joined i2i Sports, the club's owners, as a goalkeeping coach. He had made 21 appearances in all competitions by the time the 2019–20 season was abandoned and results expunged because of the COVID-19 pandemic in England.

== International career ==
Ingham was capped once for Northern Ireland at under-18 level, making his only appearance in a 2–1 home defeat to the Republic of Ireland on 9 March 1999 in 1999 UEFA European Under-18 Championship qualifying. After being understudy to David Miskelly for two under-21 matches in 2000, Ingham made his debut in a 2–0 home defeat to the Czech Republic on 23 March 2001 in 2002 UEFA European Under-21 Championship qualifying. Having made his last under-21 appearance in a 4–0 defeat to the Czech Republic on 5 June 2001 in another qualifier, his international career at this level concluded with four caps. Ingham was called into the senior Northern Ireland squad in August 2002 after Roy Carroll was released. He was called into the Northern Ireland B squad in May 2003, but was forced to withdraw because of injury. Ingham's form during a loan at Wrexham saw him placed on standby for Northern Ireland's match with Serbia and Montenegro in April 2004. He was named in the Northern Ireland squad for their tour of the Caribbean in May 2004, but dislocated a finger in training in June, which meant he missed out on making his debut.

He earned his first cap for Northern Ireland in a 4–1 home defeat against Germany in a friendly on 4 June 2005, the Irish Football Association (IFA)'s 125th anniversary match. He came on as a substitute for Maik Taylor on 76 minutes, conceding one goal scored by Lukas Podolski. On reflection of this match, Ingham said "The reaction of the crowd when I came on was amazing. To be honest I was holding back the tears as I never thought I would get such a reception. I was the proudest man in the ground." For this match, he was offered insurance by the IFA, due to him not yet being under contract at Wrexham. This appearance would result in a £30,000 payment for former club Cliftonville, which came as a part of the deal for Sunderland to sign him, but by August 2005 this had still to be received by the club. The Premier League was called into the situation by Cliftonville, as they had only received the first part of the payment after he made his first-team debut for Sunderland. Ingham himself was also due a £20,000 bonus for this appearance.

Ingham was on the bench for Northern Ireland as they beat England 1–0 in a 2006 FIFA World Cup qualifier on 7 September 2005. He received call ups for friendlies against Portugal in November 2005 and Estonia in March 2006, although he only made the bench for both matches. He was named by Northern Ireland in their end-of-season tour of the United States in May 2006, starting in the 1–0 defeat against Uruguay at the Giants Stadium on 21 May. By November 2006, he had established himself as Northern Ireland's third-choice goalkeeper behind Taylor and Carroll. Ingham came on as a substitute for the second half of Northern Ireland's 0–0 draw against Wales in a friendly on 6 February 2007, giving him his third and most recent international cap.

== Personal life ==
Ingham married his wife on 7 June 2008. He was arrested along with York teammates Michael Gash, Craig Nelthorpe and Michael Rankine in August 2009 following an incident involving two other men at a Subway outlet on a night out. The four appeared at York Magistrates' Court on 14 January 2010 after being charged with affray. Ingham pleaded not guilty to the charge of affray and this was accepted after the prosecution deemed his involvement in the incident to be minimal after appearing at York Crown Court on 1 September 2010.

== Career statistics ==
=== Club ===
As of end of 2019–20 season

Appearances and goals by club, season and competition
Club	Season	League			FA Cup		League Cup		Other		Total	
Club	Season	Division	Apps	Goals	Apps	Goals	Apps	Goals	Apps	Goals	Apps	Goals
Cliftonville	1998–99	Irish League Premier Division	18	0							18	0
Sunderland	1999–2000	Premier League	0	0	0	0	0	0	—		0	0
Sunderland	2000–01	Premier League	0	0	0	0	—		—		0	0
Sunderland	2001–02	Premier League	0	0	—		1	0	—		1	0
Sunderland	2002–03	Premier League	0	0	0	0	—		—		0	0
Sunderland	2003–04	First Division	0	0	0	0	1	0	0	0	1	0
Sunderland	2004–05	Championship	2	0	0	0	0	0	—		2	0
Sunderland	Total		2	0	0	0	2	0	0	0	4	0
Carlisle United (loan)	1999–2000	Third Division	7	0	0	0	—		—		7	0
Cliftonville (loan)	2000–01	Irish League Premier Division	20	0							20	0
Stoke City (loan)	2001–02	Second Division	0	0	0	0	—		—		0	0
Stockport County (loan)	2002–03	Second Division	0	0	—		1	0	—		1	0
Darlington (loan)	2002–03	Third Division	3	0	0	0	—		—		3	0
York City (loan)	2002–03	Third Division	17	0	—		—		—		17	0
Wrexham (loan)	2003–04	Second Division	11	0	—		—		—		11	0
Doncaster Rovers (loan)	2004–05	League One	1	0	0	0	—		1 (Note: Appearance(s) in Football League Trophy)	0	2	0
Wrexham	2005–06	League Two	40	0	1	0	1	0	1	0	43	0
Wrexham	2006–07	League Two	31	0	3	0	2	0	1	0	37	0
Wrexham	Total		71	0	4	0	3	0	2	0	80	0
Hereford United	2007–08	League Two	0	0	0	0	0	0	1	0	1	0
York City	2008–09	Conference Premier	40	0	2	0	—		10 (Note: Two appearances in Conference League Cup, eight in FA Trophy)	0	52	0
York City	2009–10	Conference Premier	43	0	4	0	—		8 (Note: Five appearances in FA Trophy, three in Conference Premier play-offs)	0	55	0
York City	2010–11	Conference Premier	45	0	5	0	—		1 (Note: Appearance(s) in FA Trophy)	0	51	0
York City	2011–12	Conference Premier	43	0	1	0	—		11 (Note: Eight appearances in FA Trophy, three in Conference Premier play-offs)	0	55	0
York City	2012–13	League Two	46	0	2	0	1	0	2	0	51	0
York City	2013–14	League Two	19	0	1	0	1	0	1	0	22	0
York City	2014–15	League Two	19	0	2	0	0	0	1	0	22	0
York City	2015–16	League Two	3	0	0	0	0	0	0	0	3	0
York City	Total		258	0	17	0	2	0	34	0	311	0
Tadcaster Albion	2016–17	Northern Premier League; Division One North	11	0	2	0	—		1	0	14	0
Tadcaster Albion	2017–18	Northern Premier League; Division One North	28	0	1	0	—		3 (Note: One appearance in Northern Premier League Challenge Cup, one in West Riding County Cup, one in Northern Premier League Division One North play-offs)	0	32	0
Tadcaster Albion	2018–19	Northern Premier League; Division One East	26	0	2	0	—		5 (Note: One appearance in Northern Premier League Challenge Cup, two in West Riding County Cup, two in FA Trophy)	0	33	0
Tadcaster Albion	Total		65	0	5	0	—		9	0	79	0
Career total			473	0	26	0	8	0	47	0	554	0

=== International ===
Appearances and goals by national team and year
National team	Year	Apps	Goals
Northern Ireland	2005	1	0
Northern Ireland	2006	1	0
Northern Ireland	2007	1	0
Total		3	0

== Honours ==
Cliftonville

- Irish FA Charity Shield: 1998

York City

- Conference Premier play-offs: 2012
- FA Trophy: 2011–12

Individual

- York City Clubman of the Year: 2009–10
