= 2010–11 York City F.C. season =

Association football club season

York City F.C.
2010–11 season
- Chairman: Jason McGill
- Manager: Martin Foyle (until 24 September 2010); Andy Porter (caretaker, from 24 September 2010 to 6 October 2010); Steve Torpey (caretaker, from 8 October 2010 to 13 October 2010); Gary Mills (from 13 October 2010)
- Ground: Bootham Crescent
- Conference Premier: 8th
- FA Cup: Third round (eliminated by Bolton Wanderers)
- FA Trophy: First round (eliminated by Boston United)
- Top goalscorer: League: Michael Rankine (12); All: Michael Rankine (14)
- Highest home attendance: 3,176 vs Darlington, Conference Premier, 27 September 2010
- Lowest home attendance: 1,318 vs Boston United, FA Trophy, 11 December 2010
- Average home league attendance: 2,485
Home colours	Away colours

The 2010–11 season was the 89th season of competitive association football and seventh season in the Football Conference played by York City Football Club, a professional football club based in York, North Yorkshire, England. Their fifth-place finish in 2009–10 meant it was their seventh successive season in the Conference Premier. The season covers the period from 1 July 2010 to 30 June 2011.

Ahead of Martin Foyle's second start to a season as York manager, six signings were made before the summer transfer window closed. With York 15th in the table 10 matches into the season Foyle resigned, and was succeeded by Tamworth's Gary Mills in October 2010. Under his guidance, York enjoyed an unbeaten run at home in the league that lasted until April 2011, when they were beaten by Mills' former team. York's push for a play-off place was ended late in the season and they finished eighth in the table. They reached the third round of the 2010–11 FA Cup, being beaten 2–0 away by Bolton Wanderers, and were knocked out in the first round of the 2010–11 FA Trophy after losing 1–0 at home to Boston United.

32 players made at least one appearance in nationally organised first-team competition, and there were 20 different goalscorers. Goalkeeper Michael Ingham and defender James Meredith missed only one of the 52 competitive matches played over the season. Michael Rankine finished as leading scorer with 14 goals, of which 12 came in league competition and two came in the FA Cup. The winner of the Clubman of the Year award, voted for by the club's supporters, was Daniel Parslow for the second time in three seasons.

== Background and pre-season ==
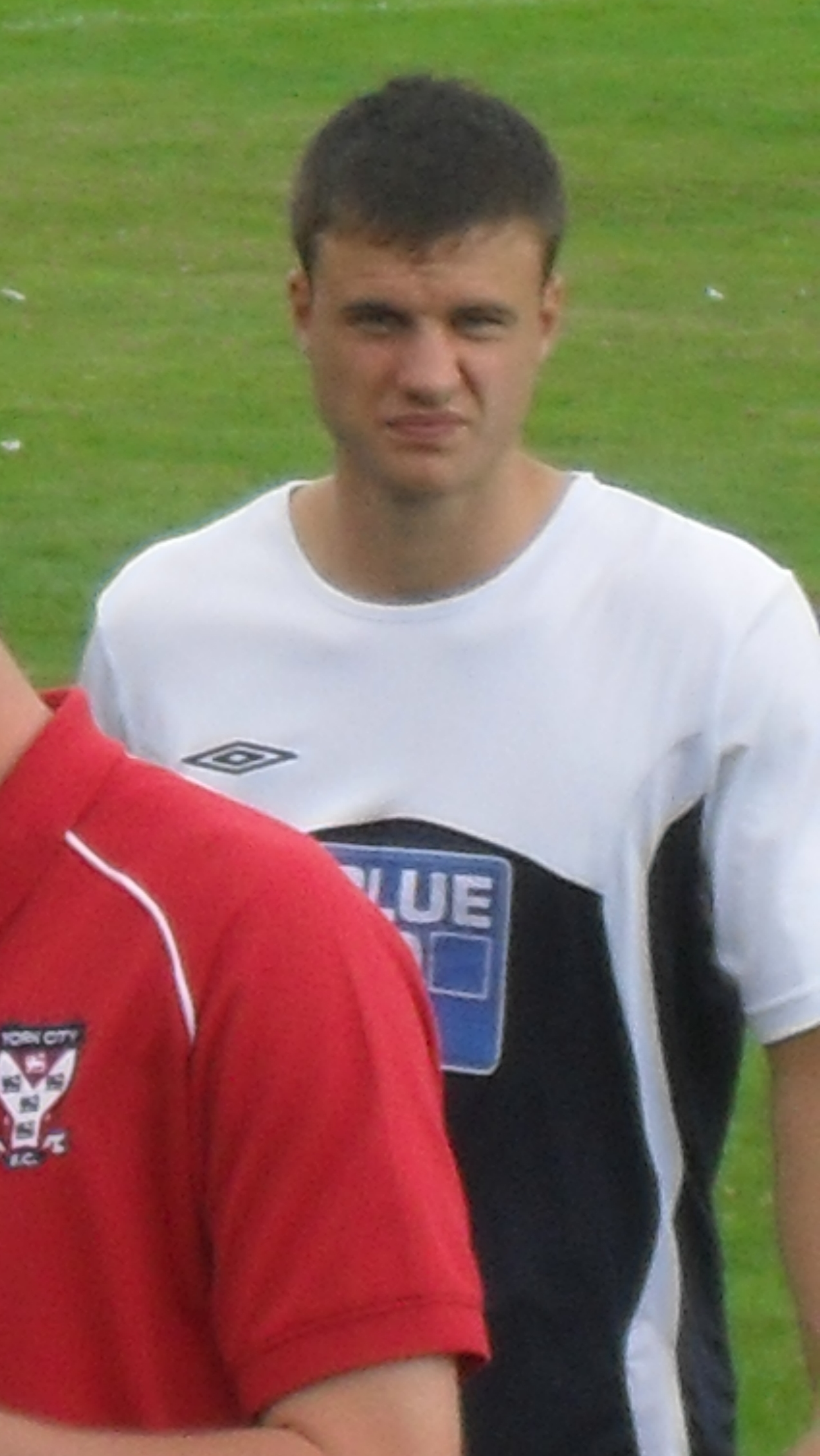
Jonathan Smith was signed from Forest Green Rovers.

The 2009–10 season was Martin Foyle's first full season as manager of York City and the team reached the play-offs after finishing fifth in the Conference Premier table. After defeating Luton Town 2–0 on aggregate in the semi-final, York were beaten 3–1 by Oxford United in the 2010 Conference Premier play-off final at Wembley Stadium. Jamie Clarke, Kevin Gall, Josh Mimms, Craig Nelthorpe, Alan O'Hare, Richard Pacquette and Simon Russell were released by York following the play-off defeat, with Luke Graham, Ben Purkiss and Adam Smith leaving for Kettering Town, Oxford and Mansfield Town respectively. Andy McWilliams was loaned out to Stalybridge Celtic. Levi Mackin and Djoumin Sangaré signed new contracts with the club.

Goalkeeper David Knight was brought in on a season-long loan from Histon before the start of the season, while two defenders, Duane Courtney and Greg Young, signed from Kidderminster Harriers and Altrincham respectively. Midfielder Jonathan Smith was signed from Forest Green Rovers, with wingers David McDermott and Peter Till joining from Kidderminster and Walsall respectively. Striker George Purcell was signed from Braintree Town for an undisclosed fee. Defender Dean Lisles and winger Jamie Hopcutt entered the first-team squad from the youth team after agreeing professional contracts.

The team adopted a new home kit, which featured red shirts with white collars, white trims on the shoulders and white sleeves that included red trims. York started the season wearing red shorts with white trims, but these were replaced later in the season with navy blue shorts with white trims. The home kit also included red shorts with white trims. The away kit, retained from the previous season, comprised light blue shirts with white horizontal stripes, light blue shorts and light blue socks. Pryers Solicitors continued as shirt sponsors for the second successive season.

Pre-season match details
Date	Opponents	Venue	Result	Score F–A	Scorers	Attendance	Ref.
17 July 2010	Hull City	H	L	0–1		2,368	
20 July 2010	Barnsley	H	L	0–2		1,393	
24 July 2010	Morecambe	H	W	1–0	McDermott (Note: Trialist) 77'	573	
27 July 2010	Scunthorpe United	H	W	1–0	Brodie 86'	906	
31 July 2010	Hartlepool United	H	D	1–1	Brodie 41'	861	
3 August 2010	Market Drayton Town	A	W	3–1	Barrett 1', Carruthers 9', Rankine 90+3' pen.		
7 August 2010	North Ferriby United	A	W	3–0	J. Smith 27', Gash 70', Purcell 90'	180	

== Review ==
=== August ===
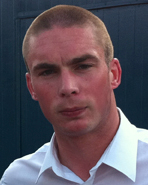
Richard Brodie signed for Crawley Town for an undisclosed fee.

York started the season with a 2–1 defeat at home to Kidderminster Harriers, who opened the scoring with a goal direct from a corner kick. After Michael Rankine equalised on 68 minutes with a penalty, Kidderminster won the match with a penalty three minutes later. Hopcutt was loaned out to Northern Premier League Premier Division club Whitby Town for a month. The team's first away match of the season was against Grimsby Town, with the match finishing a 0–0 draw. This was followed by another away draw, with Michael Gash and Till scoring against Bath City as the match finished 2–2. York then drew 0–0 at home to Barrow and the team's first victory of the season came after Rankine and Richard Brodie scored to beat Altrincham 3–0 at home. The team were defeated 2–1 away by Fleetwood Town, where Young made his debut and scored York's only goal. Brodie joined fellow Conference Premier club Crawley Town for an undisclosed fee, believed to be around £300,000, with the transfer being completed three minutes before the transfer deadline.

=== September ===
Following Brodie's departure, two strikers were signed; Leon Constantine joined on a contract until the end of the season after leaving Hereford United and youth-team coach Steve Torpey was registered as a player. Till and debutant Constantine scored in the space of two minutes in a 2–0 home win over Rushden & Diamonds. Striker David Dowson, defender Jamal Fyfield and midfielder Danny Racchi joined the club on trial and played for the reserve team against Chesterfield. Having fallen a goal behind, York earned a 1–1 draw away to Wrexham after Till scored the equalising goal. Ahead of York's home match against Hayes & Yeading United, the club signed Fyfield from Maidenhead United for a nominal fee and Racchi from Wrexham, where he had been on non-contract terms. The same day, York beat Hayes & Yeading 2–0 with goals from Rankine and Constantine, the latter making his first start for the club. York were defeated 5–0 away by Mansfield Town, with Jonathan Smith being sent off on 34 minutes after receiving a second yellow card. Hopcutt and Lisles were loaned out to Stokesley of the Northern League Division One. Manager Foyle resigned 10 matches into the season, with the team 15th in the table, and assistant manager Andy Porter was appointed caretaker manager. Porter's first match in charge was a 3–1 away victory over Tamworth, York's first away win of the season, with goals scored from Rankine, Alex Lawless and debutant Fyfield. Ahead of this match, Dowson was signed and made his debut as an 85th-minute substitute. The first home match of Porter's tenure was a 0–0 draw with Darlington, which was York's first televised appearance on sports channel Premier Sports.

=== October ===
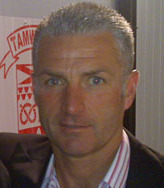
Gary Mills was appointed manager after Martin Foyle resigned.

A 2–1 defeat away by Eastbourne Borough followed, with Lawless scoring York's only goal. McDermott was released after his month-to-month contract was not extended, having made four appearances. Striker Mark Beesley was signed on a one-month loan from Fleetwood before the match against Kettering Town. York lost this match 1–0 at home and the following day Porter left the club after four matches in charge, with Torpey being appointed caretaker manager. He led the team for a 4–0 away loss to Newport County before Tamworth manager Gary Mills was appointed as manager, with Darron Gee following as assistant manager. Mills' first match in charge was a 1–1 draw at home to Bath, with York taking the lead through a first-half penalty scored by Rankine before Bath equalised in the second half. McDermott rejoined the club on another month-to-month contract to become Mills' first signing. Former York defender Chris Smith, who played under Mills at Tamworth, was signed from Mansfield on a three-month loan, with a view to a permanent transfer. With Mills stating his desire to reduce the size of a squad that was "too big", Dowson, Hopcutt and Lisles were released by the club. The first victory under Mills' management was a 2–0 win away to Kidderminster in the fourth qualifying round of the FA Cup, with Racchi and Jonathan Smith scoring their first goals for the club. Courtney was made available for loan having made seven appearances for the club. Mills' first defeat came in a 2–1 away loss against Forest Green Rovers, with former Forest Green player Lawless scoring York's only goal.

=== November ===
Beesley returned to Fleetwood after Mills decided to terminate his loan. York drew 0–0 away to League Two team Rotherham United in the first round of the FA Cup, which resulted in a replay at home. Lawless joined York's divisional rivals Luton on loan until January 2011, when a permanent transfer for an undisclosed fee would take place. Two loan signings were subsequently made; Leicester City striker Ashley Chambers joined until January 2011 and Sunderland midfielder Robbie Weir joined for one month. Rankine scored York's equaliser in a 1–1 home draw against Wrexham with a second-half penalty. York beat Rotherham 3–0 at home in their FA Cup first round replay, with Chris Smith opening the scoring before Rankine scored twice. David McGurk handed in a transfer request having expressed his desire to join Luton, after they had a number of bids for him rejected and he had turned down a contract extension with York. York recorded their first league win under Mills with a 4–0 victory away to Rushden with Racchi, Rankine, Chambers and Neil Barrett scoring. Purcell was loaned out to Conference South team Dartford until January 2011 to regain match fitness following his return from injury. The Rushden win was followed by the season's first successive league victory, after York beat Southport 2–0 at home with late goals from Constantine and McDermott. Midfielder Andre Boucaud was signed from Kettering on loan until January 2011, with a view to a permanent transfer. York progressed to the third round of the FA Cup for the second season running after beating Darlington 2–0 away in the second round. The team's run of three straight wins came to an end after a 0–0 away draw against Kidderminster.

=== December ===
Weir's loan from Sunderland was extended until January 2011, with Mills commenting: "He's a fit lad who's totally committed in what he does and I've been impressed with him". Mills was named the Conference Premier Manager of the Month for November 2010 after leading York to a seven-match unbeaten run, while Michael Ingham picked up the Player of the Month award after keeping six clean sheets and conceding one goal in this period. York were knocked out of the FA Trophy in the first round after being beaten 1–0 by Conference North team Boston United, which was the team's first home defeat under Mills. Racchi's contract with York expired, although Mills stated his intention to re-sign him once the January 2011 transfer window opened. York's away match with Luton was abandoned after 55 minutes due to heavy snow, with the score at the time being 0–0. Sangaré agreed to sign for Moroccan Botola champions Wydad Casablanca pending the expiry of his York contract at the end of December 2010, although after the transfer fell through he signed for Oxford. McDermott and Racchi agreed to sign new contracts with York once the January 2011 transfer window opened, which would keep them at the club until the end of the season. Having failed to establish a place in the team under Mills, Gash agreed to join Rushden in January 2011 on loan for the rest of the season.

=== January ===
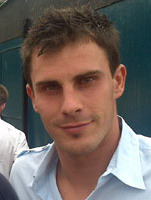
Captain Chris Smith signed for the club on a permanent contract.

York started the New Year with a 3–0 victory away to Gateshead, with Jonathan Smith, Barrett and Constantine scoring in the second half. Chambers' loan at the club was extended until the end of the season. Boucaud signed a two-and-a-half-year contract for a £20,000 fee and Chris Smith signed a one-and-a-half-year contract to join the club permanently, while Lawless departed for Luton permanently. Jamie Reed was signed from Welsh Premier League club Bangor City for an undisclosed fee, on a two-and-a-half-year contract, after York had a bid for him rejected in November 2010. York were defeated 2–0 away by Premier League team Bolton Wanderers in the FA Cup third round, with Kevin Davies and Johan Elmander scoring late in the match. Weir returned to Sunderland after his loan expired, although Mills wanted to re-sign the player. Constantine scored the only goal in a 1–0 victory at home to Grimsby with a lob over goalkeeper Kenny Arthur. York came from behind to beat Histon 2–1 away after Constantine and Till scored in the last 15 minutes. A 5–0 defeat away to Luton followed after Ingham was sent off in the 15th minute, with Chris Smith subsequently playing in goal until half-time when Young took over.

Following a trial with League Two club Cheltenham Town, Courtney was released by the club after having his contract cancelled. Mackin scored the winning goal in the 85th minute of a 2–1 home victory over Forest Green, in which Reed scored his first goal for the club. Leeds United midfielder Will Hatfield was signed on a one-month loan following a trial. York were beaten 4–0 away by Southport, with McGurk being sent off in the second minute. On transfer deadline day, former Leeds defender Liam Darville signed a contract until the end of the season and former Lincoln City midfielder Scott Kerr signed a one-and-a-half-year contract, following their release by their respective clubs. Fyfield joined former club Maidenhead on a one-month loan and Purcell joined Eastbourne on loan until the end of the season.

=== February ===
Daniel Parslow, James Meredith, Rankine and Chambers scored as York beat league leaders AFC Wimbledon 4–1 at home. Young returned to Altrincham on an emergency loan for the rest of the season. York played a second consecutive match against AFC Wimbledon, being beaten 1–0 away. This was followed by a 1–0 victory at home to Fleetwood, with Reed scoring the only goal of the match in the second half. York drew 0–0 away to Altrincham, which was the team's first draw since November 2010, before Jonathan Smith and Rankine scored as York won 2–1 away to Hayes & Yeading.

=== March ===
Jonathan Smith scored in a second successive match to give York the lead at home to Gateshead, although the winning goal of a 2–1 victory was scored by Constantine with a penalty. Hatfield's loan from Leeds was extended until the end of the season, after he made two appearances during his first month at the club. McGurk signed a new contract with York, which contracted him to the club until June 2013. York drew 0–0 away to Barrow. Fyfield opted not to extend his loan at Maidenhead, to fight for a place in the team. Rankine scored the only goal to give York a 1–0 victory at home to Eastbourne, with a header from a Till cross during the first half. Reed came off the bench to score both goals as York came from behind to beat Mansfield 2–1 at home. He scored for a second successive match away to Cambridge United, although York lost 2–1. Winger Aidan Chippendale was signed on loan from Huddersfield Town for the rest of the season. Reed scored his fourth goal in three matches as York beat Histon 1–0 at home.

=== April and May ===
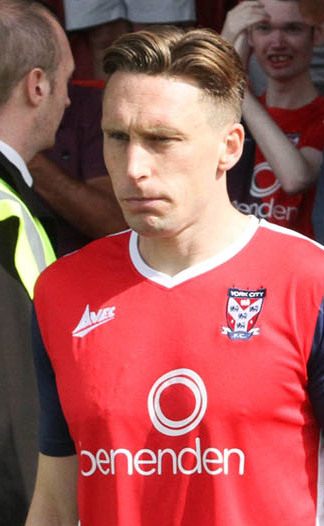
Daniel Parslow was voted Clubman of the Year for the second time.

Rankine missed an 87th-minute penalty for York away to Kettering, with Reed scoring the team's goal in a 1–1 draw. Jonathan Smith scored in the first half for York at home to league-leaders Crawley, who equalised in the second half, with the match finishing a 1–1 draw. Racchi was released from his contract with immediate effect after requesting a transfer, having failed to establish himself in the team. York beat Newport 2–1 at home, with Rankine opening the scoring before assisting Reed for the second goal. McGurk picked up an ankle ligament injury in this match, which ruled him out for the rest of the season. York suffered their first defeat at home since December 2010 after losing 2–1 to Tamworth, in which Constantine scored a consolation goal in the 89th minute. Having not made any appearances for the club, Chippendale was recalled by Huddersfield. Reed scored the only goal to give York a 1–0 victory at home to Luton. Young was recalled from his loan at Altrincham after Parslow suffered a head injury during the match against Luton.

York were beaten 2–1 away to Darlington, in which Chris Carruthers scored a consolation goal in the 87th minute. York's hopes of making the play-offs were ended after drawing 0–0 with Cambridge in the last home match of the season. The last match of the season was a 1–1 draw away to champions-elect Crawley. York took the lead in the fifth minute through an own goal scored by David Hunt, before the home team equalised with a Matt Tubbs penalty in the 68th minute. York finished the season in eighth place in the Conference Premier table, seven points adrift of a play-off place. The Clubman of the Year award, voted for by the club's supporters, was won by Parslow for the second time in three seasons. He was presented with the trophy at an awards' ceremony held at Bootham Crescent.

== Summary and aftermath ==
York spent most of the season in midtable, and having been as low as 19th in the table in November went on to reach sixth place during the last month of the season. The team's goals scored tally of 55 was the lowest of any team in the top half of the table, and the sixth lowest of any team in the division. Ingham and Meredith made the highest number of appearances during the season, each appearing in 51 of York's 52 matches. Rankine was York's top scorer in the league and in all competitions, with 12 league goals and 14 in total. He was the only player to reach double figures, and was followed by Reed with nine goals.

Before the start of the new season York released Barrett, Carruthers, Constantine, Darville, Gash, Mackin and McWilliams, with Purcell, Rankine, Jonathan Smith, Till and Young leaving for Dover Athletic, Aldershot Town, Swindon Town, Fleetwood and Alfreton Town respectively. Fyfield, Ingham and Meredith signed new contracts with York, and McDermott was retained on non-contract terms. The club's new arrivals were goalkeeper Paul Musselwhite from Lincoln, defender Lanre Oyebanjo from Histon, midfielders Paddy McLaughlin from Newcastle United, Adriano Moke from Jerez Industrial and Michael Potts from Blackburn Rovers, winger Matty Blair from Kidderminster, and strikers Chambers from Leicester, Liam Henderson from Watford and Jason Walker from Luton.

== Match details ==
League positions are sourced by Statto, while the remaining information is referenced individually.

=== Conference Premier ===
Conference Premier match details
Date	League position	Opponents	Venue	Result	Score F–A	Scorers	Attendance	Ref.
14 August 2010	15th	Kidderminster Harriers	H	L	1–2	Rankine 86' pen.	2,682	
17 August 2010	21st	Grimsby Town	A	D	0–0		5,037	
21 August 2010	19th	Bath City	A	D	2–2	Gash 43', Till 81'	1,066	
24 August 2010	21st	Barrow	H	D	0–0		2,212	
28 August 2010	14th	Altrincham	H	W	3–0	Rankine (2) 70', 90', Brodie 75' pen.	2,095	
30 August 2010	16th	Fleetwood Town	A	L	1–2	Young 87'	2,020	
4 September 2010	12th	Rushden & Diamonds	H	W	2–0	Till 76', Constantine 78'	2,306	
11 September 2010	13th	Wrexham	A	D	1–1	Till 19'	2,446	
18 September 2010	10th	Hayes & Yeading United	H	W	2–0	Rankine 56', Constantine 73'	2,252	
21 September 2010	15th	Mansfield Town	A	L	0–5		2,202	
25 September 2010	10th	Tamworth	A	W	3–1	Rankine 27' pen., Lawless 58', Fyfield 72'	1,282	
27 September 2010	10th	Darlington	H	D	0–0		3,176	
2 October 2010	13th	Eastbourne Borough	A	L	1–2	Lawless 68'	1,104	
5 October 2010	15th	Kettering Town	H	L	0–1		1,978	
9 October 2010	16th	Newport County	A	L	0–4		2,802	
16 October 2010	16th	Bath City	H	D	1–1	Rankine 30' pen.	2,331	
30 October 2010	19th	Forest Green Rovers	A	L	1–2	Lawless 72'	792	
14 November 2010	19th	Wrexham	H	D	1–1	Rankine 79' pen.	2,601	
20 November 2010	16th	Rushden & Diamonds	A	W	4–0	Racchi 8', Rankine 24', Chambers 36', Barrett 86'	1,132	
23 November 2010	12th	Southport	H	W	2–0	Constantine 88' pen., McDermott 90'	2,104	
30 November 2010	14th	Kidderminster Harriers	A	D	0–0		1,066	
1 January 2011	12th	Gateshead	A	W	3–0	J. Smith 61', Barrett 66', Constantine 89'	1,231	
11 January 2011	12th	Grimsby Town	H	W	1–0	Constantine 19'	3,028	
15 January 2011	10th	Histon	A	W	2–1	Constantine 76', Till 86'	578	
18 January 2011	10th	Luton Town	A	L	0–5		5,997	
22 January 2011	10th	Forest Green Rovers	H	W	2–1	Reed 56', Mackin 85'	2,468	
29 January 2011	11th	Southport	A	L	0–4		1,308	
1 February 2011	10th	AFC Wimbledon	H	W	4–1	Parslow 16', Meredith 45', Rankine 70', Chambers 84'	2,438	
12 February 2011	12th	AFC Wimbledon	A	L	0–1		3,532	
15 February 2011	9th	Fleetwood Town	H	W	1–0	Reed 48'	2,220	
22 February 2011	11th	Altrincham	A	D	0–0		1,143	
26 February 2011	7th	Hayes & Yeading United	A	W	2–1	J. Smith 23', Rankine 80'	458	
1 March 2011	7th	Gateshead	H	W	2–1	J. Smith 8', Constantine 63' pen.	2,290	
5 March 2011	7th	Barrow	A	D	0–0		1,342	
12 March 2011	7th	Eastbourne Borough	H	W	1–0	Rankine 16'	2,357	
15 March 2011	6th	Mansfield Town	H	W	2–1	Reed (2) 59', 69'	2,261	
19 March 2011	7th	Cambridge United	A	L	1–2	Reed 24'	2,474	
26 March 2011	7th	Histon	H	W	1–0	Reed 48'	2,364	
2 April 2011	7th	Kettering Town	A	D	1–1	Reed 8'	1,365	
5 April 2011	7th	Crawley Town	H	D	1–1	J. Smith 14'	3,060	
9 April 2011	7th	Newport County	H	W	2–1	Rankine 50' pen., Reed 70'	2,565	
16 April 2011	7th	Tamworth	H	L	1–2	Constantine 89'	2,484	
19 April 2011	6th	Luton Town	H	W	1–0	Reed 65'	2,955	
23 April 2011	7th	Darlington	A	L	1–2	Carruthers 87'	2,966	
25 April 2011	7th	Cambridge United	H	D	0–0		2,939	
30 April 2011	8th	Crawley Town	A	D	1–1	Hunt 5' o.g.	2,945	

=== League table (part) ===
Final Conference Premier table (part)
Pos	Club	Pld	W	D	L	F	A	GD	Pts
6th	Kidderminster Harriers	46	20	17	9	74	60	+14	72
7th	Darlington	46	18	17	11	61	42	+19	71
8th	York City	46	19	14	13	55	50	+5	71
9th	Newport County	46	18	15	13	78	60	+18	69
10th	Bath City	46	16	15	15	64	68	−4	63
Key	Pos = League position; Pld = Matches played; W = Matches won; D = Matches drawn; L = Matches lost; F = Goals for; A = Goals against; GD = Goal difference; Pts = Points								
Source									

=== FA Cup ===
FA Cup match details
Round	Date	Opponents	Venue	Result	Score F–A	Scorers	Attendance	Ref.
Fourth qualifying round	23 October 2010	Kidderminster Harriers	A	W	2–0	Racchi 24', J. Smith 54'	1,123	
First round	6 November 2010	Rotherham United	A	D	0–0		3,227	
First round replay	17 November 2010	Rotherham United	H	W	3–0	C. Smith 66', Rankine (2) 71' pen., 79'	2,644	
Second round	27 November 2010	Darlington	A	W	2–0	Sangaré 44', Chambers 90+3'	3,481	
Third round	8 January 2011	Bolton Wanderers	A	L	0–2		13,120	

=== FA Trophy ===
FA Trophy match details
Round	Date	Opponents	Venue	Result	Score F–A	Scorers	Attendance	Ref.
First round	11 December 2010	Boston United	H	L	0–1		1,318	

== Transfers ==
=== In ===
Date	Player	Club†	Fee	Ref.
24 May 2010	Duane Courtney	(Kidderminster Harriers)	Free	
24 May 2010	Greg Young	(Altrincham)	Free	
29 June 2010	Peter Till	(Walsall)	Free	
6 July 2010	George Purcell	Braintree Town	Undisclosed	
6 July 2010	Jonathan Smith	(Forest Green Rovers)	Compensation	
28 July 2010	David McDermott	(Kidderminster Harriers)	Free	
3 September 2010	Leon Constantine	(Hereford United)	Free	
18 September 2010	Jamal Fyfield	Maidenhead United	Nominal	
18 September 2010	Danny Racchi	(Wrexham)	Free	
25 September 2010	David Dowson	(Gateshead)	Free	
19 October 2010	David McDermott	(York City)	Free	
27 December 2010	Danny Racchi	(York City)	Free	
5 January 2011	Andre Boucaud	Kettering Town	£20,000	
5 January 2011	Chris Smith	Mansfield Town	Free	
6 January 2011	Jamie Reed	Bangor City	Undisclosed	
31 January 2011	Liam Darville	(Leeds United)	Free	
31 January 2011	Scott Kerr	(Lincoln City)	Free	

† Brackets around club names denote the player's contract with that club had expired before he joined York.

=== Out ===
Date	Player	Club†	Fee	Ref.
31 August 2010	Richard Brodie	Crawley Town	Undisclosed	
5 October 2010	David McDermott	(York City)	Released	
22 October 2010	David Dowson	(Durham City)	Released	
22 October 2010	Jamie Hopcutt	(Ossett Town)	Released	
22 October 2010	Dean Lisles	(Stokesley)	Released	
17 December 2010	Danny Racchi	(York City)	Released	
31 December 2010	Djoumin Sangaré	(Oxford United)	Free	
5 January 2011	Alex Lawless	Luton Town	Undisclosed	
21 January 2011	Duane Courtney	(Tamworth)	Released	
7 April 2011	Danny Racchi	(Kilmarnock)	Released	
7 May 2011	Michael Gash	(Cambridge United)	Released	
7 May 2011	Andy McWilliams	(Stalybridge Celtic)	Released	
12 May 2011	Michael Rankine	(Aldershot Town)	Free	
25 May 2011	Peter Till	(Fleetwood Town)	Free	
1 June 2011	Greg Young	(Alfreton Town)	Free	
23 June 2011	Neil Barrett	(Havant & Waterlooville)	Released	
23 June 2011	Chris Carruthers	(Gateshead)	Released	
23 June 2011	Leon Constantine	(Braintree Town)	Released	
23 June 2011	Liam Darville	(Harrogate Town)	Released	
23 June 2011	Levi Mackin	(Alfreton Town)	Released	

† Brackets around club names denote the player joined that club after his York contract expired.

=== Loans in ===
Date	Player	Club	Return	Ref.
30 July 2010	David Knight	Histon	End of season	
5 October 2010	Mark Beesley	Fleetwood Town	Terminated early 1 November 2010	
21 October 2010	Chris Smith	Mansfield Town	Made permanent 5 January 2010	
12 November 2010	Ashley Chambers	Leicester City	End of season	
12 November 2010	Robbie Weir	Sunderland	10 January 2011	
26 November 2010	Andre Boucaud	Kettering Town	Made permanent 5 January 2010	
28 January 2011	Will Hatfield	Leeds United	End of season	
25 March 2011	Aidan Chippendale	Huddersfield Town	Recalled 19 April 2011	

=== Loans out ===
Date	Player	Club	Return	Ref.
13 August 2010	Andy McWilliams	Stalybridge Celtic	End of season	
16 August 2010	Jamie Hopcutt	Whitby Town	One-month	
24 September 2010	Jamie Hopcutt	Stokesley	Released 22 October 2010	
24 September 2010	Dean Lisles	Stokesley	Released 22 October 2010	
8 November 2010	Alex Lawless	Luton Town	Made permanent 5 January 2011	
23 November 2010	George Purcell	Dartford	28 January 2011	
1 January 2011	Michael Gash	Rushden & Diamonds	End of season	
31 January 2011	Jamal Fyfield	Maidenhead United	9 March 2011	
31 January 2011	George Purcell	Eastbourne Borough	End of season	
7 February 2011	Greg Young	Altrincham	Recalled 20 April 2011	

== Appearances and goals ==
Numbers in parentheses denote appearances as substitute.
Players with names struck through and marked † left the club during the playing season.
Players with names in italics and marked * were on loan from another club for the whole of their season with York.
Players listed with no appearances have been in the matchday squad but only as unused substitutes.
Key to positions: GK – Goalkeeper; DF – Defender; MF – Midfielder; FW – Forward

Players included in matchday squads
No.	Pos.	Nat.	Name	League		FA Cup		FA Trophy		Total		Discipline	
No.	Pos.	Nat.	Name	Apps	Goals	Apps	Goals	Apps	Goals	Apps	Goals	A yellow rectangle, denoting the yellow penalty card shown to a player being cautioned	A red rectangle, denoting the red penalty card shown to a player being sent off
1	GK	ENG	David Knight *	1	0	0	0	0	0	1	0	0	0
2	DF	ENG	~~Duane Courtney~~ †	4 (3)	0	0	0	0	0	4 (3)	0	0	0
2	DF	ENG	Liam Darville	17	0	0	0	0	0	17	0	2	0
3	DF	AUS	James Meredith	43 (2)	1	5	0	1	0	49 (2)	1	3	0
4	MF	ENG	Jonathan Smith	30 (9)	4	5	1	0	0	35 (9)	5	14	2
5	DF	ENG	David McGurk	34	0	5	0	1	0	40	0	5	1
6	DF	WAL	Daniel Parslow	41 (1)	1	4	0	1	0	46 (1)	1	3	0
7	MF	WAL	~~Alex Lawless~~ †	16	3	2	0	0	0	18	3	6	0
7	FW	WAL	Jamie Reed	12 (11)	9	0 (1)	0	0	0	12 (12)	9	1	0
8	MF	ENG	Peter Till	29 (12)	4	2 (1)	0	0 (1)	0	31 (14)	4	0	0
9	FW	ENG	Michael Gash	12 (5)	1	0 (1)	0	0	0	12 (6)	1	2	0
10	FW	ENG	George Purcell	0 (1)	0	0	0	0	0	0 (1)	0	0	0
11	MF	ENG	Chris Carruthers	14 (12)	1	2 (1)	0	0	0	16 (13)	1	3	0
12	DF	FRA	~~Djoumin Sangaré~~ †	9 (1)	0	3	1	0 (1)	0	12 (2)	1	2	0
14	MF	ENG	Neil Barrett	19 (3)	2	1 (2)	0	0	0	20 (5)	2	2	0
15	FW	ENG	Michael Rankine	34 (8)	12	5	2	1	0	40 (8)	14	5	0
16	FW	ENG	~~Richard Brodie~~ †	6	1	0	0	0	0	6	1	2	0
16	DF	ENG	Jamal Fyfield	9 (2)	1	0 (3)	0	0	0	9 (5)	1	0	0
17	MF	WAL	Levi Mackin	6 (6)	1	0 (1)	0	0	0	6 (7)	1	1	0
18	DF	ENG	Greg Young	9 (3)	1	0	0	0	0	9 (3)	1	3	0
19	FW	ENG	Ashley Chambers *	22 (4)	2	2	1	1	0	25 (4)	3	7	0
20	MF	ENG	Will Hatfield *	1 (3)	0	0	0	0	0	1 (3)	0	1	0
21	MF	NIR	~~Robbie Weir~~ * †	5	0	2	0	1	0	8	0	1	0
22	MF	ENG	David McDermott	8 (9)	1	3	0	1	0	12 (9)	1	0	0
23	MF	ENG	Tom Richardson	0	0	0	0	0	0	0	0	0	0
24	GK	NIR	Michael Ingham	45	0	5	0	1	0	51	0	1	1
25	FW	ENG	Leon Constantine	13 (13)	8	1 (1)	0	0 (1)	0	14 (15)	8	0	0
27	MF	ENG	~~Danny Racchi~~ †	15 (2)	1	3 (2)	1	1	0	19 (4)	2	2	0
28	FW	ENG	~~David Dowson~~ †	0 (5)	0	0	0	0	0	0 (5)	0	0	0
28	MF	TRI	Andre Boucaud	10 (9)	0	0	0	1	0	11 (9)	0	4	0
29	FW	ENG	~~Mark Beesley~~ * †	2 (1)	0	0	0	0	0	2 (1)	0	0	0
29	MF	ENG	Scott Kerr	16	0	0	0	0	0	16	0	6	1
30	DF	ENG	Chris Smith	24	0	5	1	1	0	30	1	9	0

Players not included in matchday squads
No.	Pos.	Nat.	Name
12	MF	ENG	~~Aidan Chippendale~~ * †
19	DF	ENG	~~Dean Lisles~~ †
20	DF	ENG	Andy McWilliams
21	MF	ENG	~~Jamie Hopcutt~~ †
21	MF	GHA	Papa Agyemang
26	FW	ENG	Steve Torpey

== See also ==
- List of York City F.C. seasons
