= Duane Courtney =

English association football player (born 1985)

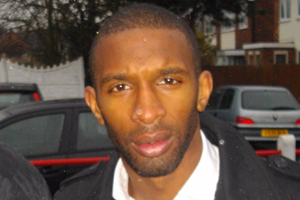
- Courtney in 2011

Personal information
- Full name: Duane Jerome Courtney
- Date of birth: 7 January 1985 (age 41)
- Place of birth: Oldbury, England
- Height: 5 ft 11 in (1.80 m)
- Position: Right-back

Youth career
- 1999–2001: Derby County
- 2001–2004: Birmingham City

Senior career*
Years	Team	Apps	(Gls)
2004–2005	AFC Telford United		
2005–2006	Burnley	7	(0)
2006–2009	The New Saints	73	(4)
2009–2010	Kidderminster Harriers	41	(1)
2010–2011	York City	7	(0)
2011–2014	Tamworth	95	(3)
2014–2015	Alfreton Town	14	(0)
2015–2016	Corby Town	35	(2)
2016–2017	Redditch United	42	(1)
2017	Bromsgrove Sporting	4	(0)
2017–2022	Highgate United		
- * Club domestic league appearances and goals as of 15:58, 13 December 2017 (UTC)

Duane Jerome Courtney (born 7 January 1985) is an English retired footballer who played as a right-back. He played in the Football League for Burnley.

Courtney started his career in the youth system of Derby County as a schoolboy and later played for Birmingham City as a trainee. He played for AFC Telford United in the 2004–05 season and after being named their Player of the Season he joined Burnley in the Championship. After making eight appearances for them in one season he was released and joined Welsh Premier League champions The New Saints in 2006. He played for them for three seasons before returning to England with Conference Premier club Kidderminster Harriers in 2009. He left Kidderminster after one season to sign for York City, who released him in 2011. He then played for Tamworth but left after their relegation to the Conference North to join Alfreton Town in 2014.

== Career ==
=== Early career ===
Courtney joined the Derby County youth system as a schoolboy in 1999 before joining Birmingham City as a trainee in 2001. He was also a reserve-team player for Birmingham. He went on trial with Second Division club Colchester United in April 2004 after being recommended to the club by former Birmingham player Craig Fagan. Released by Birmingham in the summer of 2004 after not being offered professional terms, Courtney considered giving up football before joining Northern Premier League First Division club AFC Telford United in August following a trial. He scored for Telford in a 4–2 defeat to Kidsgrove Athletic in the FA Trophy preliminary round in October, which was the team's first match in the competition. Courtney played in the 2–1 win over Kendal Town in the 2005 Northern Premier League First Division play-off Final, seeing the club promoted to the Northern Premier League Premier Division. He received Telford's Supporters' Player of the Season, Manager's Player of the Season and Players' Player of the Season awards for the 2004–05 season and signed a new one-year contract in the summer of 2005.

=== Burnley ===
He drew attention from Football League clubs and on 31 August 2005 signed for Championship club Burnley on a two-year contract for an initial fee of £25,000 with a sell-on clause after having a trial with the club, having opted not to join Wolverhampton Wanderers. He made his first-team debut as a substitute in the 89th minute of a 1–0 victory away to Leicester City on 18 October, which was followed by a stoppage time appearance in a 1–0 defeat away to Aston Villa in the League Cup on 25 October. His first and only start for Burnley came in a 3–2 victory away to Luton Town on 5 November, in which he gave a solid performance. Having struggled to break into the team, Courtney finished 2005–06 with eight appearances, seven coming from the substitutes' bench, and was placed on the transfer list in May 2006. He rejected an offer from Conference National club Kidderminster Harriers in July 2006 on the advice of his agent and was eventually released by Burnley on 17 August after having his contract cancelled.

=== The New Saints ===
Following a trial with League Two club Bury, Courtney signed for Welsh Premier League champions The New Saints (TNS) on a free transfer on 20 September 2006 and he believed playing in this league was an "ideal shop window in which to develop his career and showcase his talent". He finished 2006–07 with 29 appearances and 3 goals in all competitions and was named in the Welsh Premier League Team of the Year for the season, having been a key member of the team that won the League and the FAW Premier Cup. Courtney played for TNS in both legs of their 4–4 draw on aggregate with FK Ventspils in the 2007–08 UEFA Champions League first qualifying round, a result that ended the team's involvement in the tournament due to the away goal rule. He finished 2007–08 with 29 appearances and 1 goal in all competitions. Two further European appearances came in 2008–09, playing in both legs of the 2–0 defeat on aggregate to FK Sūduva in the 2008–09 UEFA Cup first qualifying round. Courtney came on as a 90th-minute substitute for TNS in the 2009 Welsh League Cup Final, which the team won with a 2–0 victory over Bangor City. He made 40 appearances and scored 1 goal in all competitions and the club announced in April 2009 that he would be released when his contract expired on 30 June.

=== Kidderminster Harriers ===
After "composed performances" on trial in pre-season, Courtney signed a one-year contract with Conference Premier club Kidderminster Harriers on 20 July 2009. He made his debut as a substitute in the 66th minute of a 1–0 victory over Hayes & Yeading United on 8 August 2009, which was followed by his first start in a 1–0 defeat to Salisbury City on 11 August due to Liam Dolman not being fit. He played against Tamworth on 31 August 2009 despite an injury and although he was still suffering this injury he was able to play in the next match, a 2–0 defeat to Eastbourne Borough. Courtney commented in September 2009 that Kidderminster's defence was taking time to gel, saying "We've all played at a high standard, individually and collectively we are good, but there's something missing. I think it's communication between us, which is why we're making mistakes." His first and only goal for Kidderminster came with a low shot against Kettering Town in a 2–0 away victory on 21 November 2009 and manager Mark Yates said "It was a good finish by Duane, he does it in training quite often". He played for Kidderminster in their run to the FA Trophy semi-final, in which they were beaten 5–1 on aggregate by Stevenage Borough. Courtney suffered an ankle injury against Cambridge United on 30 March 2010 and returned in the following match against Altrincham on 3 April, in which he was forced to be substituted due to his ankle. He did not miss any further playing time as he featured in the following match, a 1–1 draw with Rushden & Diamonds on 5 April 2010. He finished 2009–10 with 49 appearances and 1 goal for Kidderminster.

=== York City ===
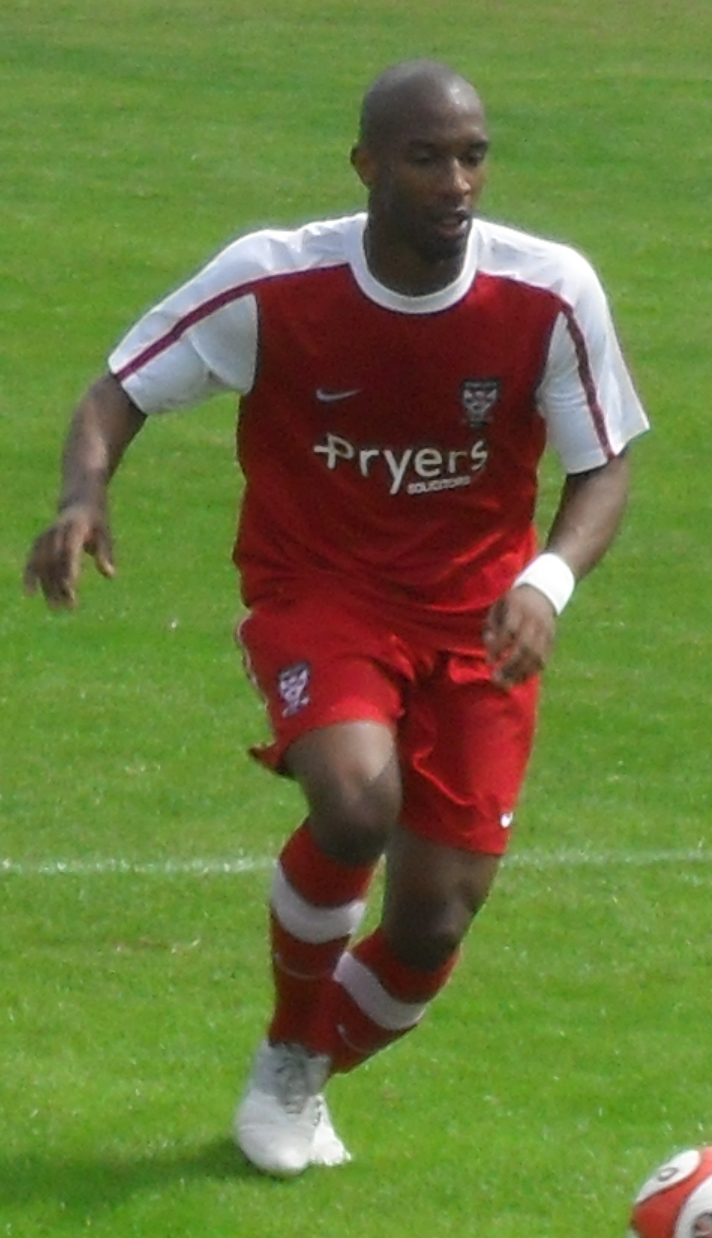
Courtney playing for York City in 2010

Following the signing of Lee Vaughan in the summer of 2010, Courtney's position at Kidderminster looked tenuous and the club stalled on a new contract as they were finalising their budget for the forthcoming season. He joined Kidderminster's Conference Premier rivals York City on 24 May 2010 on a one-year contract. He made his debut in a 2–1 defeat to former club Kidderminster as a 76th-minute substitute on 14 August 2010, the opening day of 2010–11, and he conceded a penalty kick in the 89th minute that was scored by the opposition. His first start for the club came in a 1–1 draw away to Wrexham on 11 September 2010. Having made seven appearances for York, Courtney was made available for loan on 28 October 2010. He went on trial with League Two club Cheltenham Town in January 2011, who were managed by Yates, Courtney's manager at Kidderminster. He impressed playing in central defence in Cheltenham's reserve match against Coventry City. Courtney was released by York after his contract was cancelled on 21 January 2011, after which he agreed to train with Cheltenham for one week. However, Cheltenham decided to not offer him a contract.

=== Tamworth ===
Courtney signed with Conference Premier club Tamworth on 3 February 2011 and he made his debut as a 75th-minute substitute in a 1–0 defeat to Histon two days later. He finished the season with 18 appearances for Tamworth.

Courtney signed a new two-year contract with Tamworth on 22 June 2011, keeping him at the club until the summer of 2013. On 1 January 2012, he scored his first goal for the club with a shot into the bottom corner in a 2–2 draw with Alfreton Town. Courtney made 44 appearances and scored 1 goal in 2012–13 and won the club's Players' Player of the Year, Manager's Player of the Year and Supporter's Player of the Year awards. He made 23 appearances and scored 2 goals for Tamworth in 2013–14, which finished with the club's relegation to the Conference North, and he missed a number of matches due to hamstring problems.

=== Later career ===
Courtney signed for Conference Premier club Alfreton Town on 4 June 2014 and made his debut in a 2–0 away defeat to Forest Green Rovers on 16 August. He made 18 appearances in 2014–15 as the club was relegated after finishing 21st in the Conference Premier.

Courtney signed for newly promoted National League North club Corby Town on 14 June 2015. He joined Southern League Premier Division club Redditch United on 31 May 2016. On 6 June 2017, Courtney signed for Midland League Premier Division club Bromsgrove Sporting. He signed for their divisional rivals Highgate United in September 2017.

== Style of play ==
Courtney primarily plays as a right-back and is a versatile player, also being able to play at left-back and centre-back. He is an attacking player and has pace and athleticism. Courtney said of his play "I can run for 90 minutes up and down and get forward quite well, as well as getting back. I'm strong, quick and quite good in the air for my height" in 2010. York manager Martin Foyle described him as "exciting" and said "He's got the energy to get forward".

== Personal life ==
Courtney was born in Oldbury, West Midlands. He lived in nearby Birmingham with his partner and two children up until 2010 when he moved to York following his transfer to York City. However, he failed to settle in York and after leaving the club in 2011 he returned to live in Birmingham.

== Career statistics ==
As of match played 2 December 2017

Appearances and goals by club, season and competition
Club	Season	League			National Cup (Note: Includes Welsh Cup, FA Cup)		League Cup (Note: Includes League Cup, Welsh League Cup)		Other		Total	
Club	Season	Division	Apps	Goals	Apps	Goals	Apps	Goals	Apps	Goals	Apps	Goals
Burnley	2005–06	Championship	7	0	0	0	1	0	—		8	0
Burnley	2006–07	Championship	0	0	—		—		—		0	0
Burnley	Total		7	0	0	0	1	0	—		8	0
The New Saints	2006–07	Welsh Premier League	22	2	1	0	3	1	3	0	29	3
The New Saints	2007–08	Welsh Premier League	23	1	1	0	3	0	2 (Note: Appearances in UEFA Champions League)	0	29	1
The New Saints	2008–09	Welsh Premier League	28	1	3	0	7	0	2 (Note: Appearances in UEFA Cup)	0	40	1
The New Saints	Total		73	4	5	0	13	1	7	0	98	5
Kidderminster Harriers	2009–10	Conference Premier	41	1	2	0	—		6 (Note: Appearance(s) in FA Trophy)	0	49	1
York City	2010–11	Conference Premier	7	0	0	0	—		0	0	7	0
Tamworth	2010–11	Conference Premier	18	0	—		—		—		18	0
Tamworth	2011–12	Conference Premier	19	1	3	0	—		1	0	23	1
Tamworth	2012–13	Conference Premier	39	0	1	0	—		4	1	44	1
Tamworth	2013–14	Conference Premier	19	2	3	0	—		1	0	23	2
Tamworth	Total		95	3	7	0	—		6	1	108	4
Alfreton Town	2014–15	Conference Premier	14	0	2	0	—		2	0	18	0
Corby Town	2015–16	National League North	35	2	2	0	—		1	0	38	2
Redditch United	2016–17	Southern League Premier Division	42	1	1	0	—		1	0	44	1
Bromsgrove Sporting	2017–18	Midland League Premier Division	4	0	1	0	—		—		5	0
Highgate United	2017–18	Midland League Premier Division	5	1	—		—		5 (Note: One appearance in Midland League Cup, two in FA Vase, one in Birmingham Senior Cup, one in JW Hunt Cup)	0	10	1
Career total			323	11	20	0	14	1	28	1	385	13

== Honours ==
AFC Telford United

- Northern Premier League First Division play-offs: 2005

The New Saints

- Welsh Premier League: 2006–07
- Welsh League Cup: 2008–09
- FAW Premier Cup: 2006–07

Individual

- AFC Telford United Player of the Season: 2004–05
- Welsh Premier League Team of the Year: 2006–07
- Tamworth Player of the Year: 2012–13
