= Michael Rankine =

English association football player (born 1985)

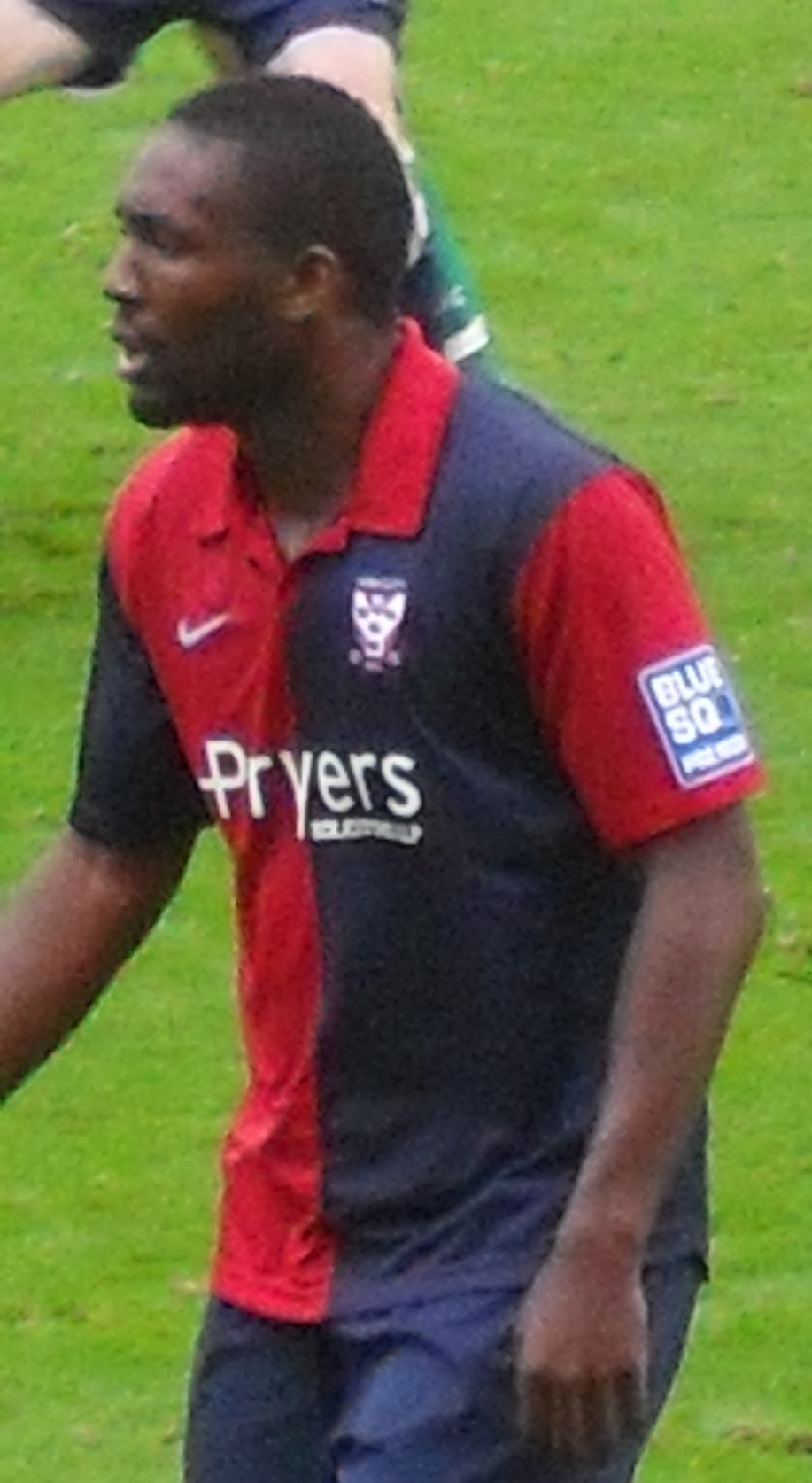
- Rankine playing for York City in 2009

Personal information
- Full name: Michael Lee Rankine
- Date of birth: 15 January 1985 (age 41)
- Place of birth: Doncaster, England
- Height: 6 ft 1 in (1.86 m)
- Position: Striker

Youth career
- –2002: Doncaster Rovers

Senior career*
Years	Team	Apps	(Gls)
2002–2003	Doncaster Rovers	0	(0)
2002	→ Armthorpe Welfare (loan)		
2003–2004	Barrow	48	(10)
2004–2005	Scunthorpe United	21	(1)
2005	→ Barrow (loan)	11	(3)
2006	Armthorpe Welfare		
2006	Alfreton Town	22	(3)
2006–2009	Rushden & Diamonds	117	(26)
2008	→ AFC Bournemouth (loan)	3	(0)
2009–2011	York City	85	(20)
2011–2013	Aldershot Town	46	(3)
2012–2013	→ Grimsby Town (loan)	3	(0)
2013	→ York City (loan)	8	(0)
2013–2014	Hereford United	31	(7)
2014–2015	Gateshead	31	(4)
2015–2016	Altrincham	40	(12)
2016–2017	Guiseley	39	(6)
2017–2018	York City	8	(2)
Total		513	(97)
- * Club domestic league appearances and goals

Michael Lee Rankine (born 15 January 1985) is an English former professional footballer who played as a striker. He played in the Football League for Scunthorpe United, AFC Bournemouth, Aldershot Town and York City.

Rankine began his career with the Doncaster Rovers youth system, before playing for Armthorpe Welfare and Barrow in non-League football. He moved to League Two club Scunthorpe United in 2004 but after only scoring one goal for them signed for Alfreton Town. He signed for Conference National club Rushden & Diamonds in 2006, where he played for three seasons, before signing for divisional rivals York City in 2009. He played for them in the 2010 Conference Premier play-off final before signing for Aldershot Town in 2011. He spent two seasons at Aldershot and during that time had loan spells with Grimsby Town and York. After a season with Hereford United he signed for Gateshead in 2014.

== Career ==
=== Early career ===
Born in Doncaster, South Yorkshire, Rankine started his career in the youth system of hometown club Doncaster Rovers. He played for Armthorpe Welfare on work experience in 2002 and was released by Doncaster at the end of the 2002–03 season after failing to progress into their first team. He signed for Northern Premier League Premier Division club Barrow in the summer of 2003. He was unable to play for them in the opening match of 2003–04 after suffering whiplash following a car crash. He made 47 appearances and scored nine goals in 2003–04.

=== Scunthorpe United ===
Rankine signed for League Two club Scunthorpe United on 15 September 2004 on non-contract terms, following a trial after being recommended to the club by Barrow manager Lee Turnbull. The move came having made 11 appearances and scored three goals for Barrow up to that point during 2004–05. He scored the winning goal for Scunthorpe away to Bury on his debut with a close range finish from Andy Crosby's knock-down in the 89th minute, which gave his team a 1–0 victory. He started for Scunthorpe in a 3–1 defeat to eventual Premier League champions Chelsea in the FA Cup third round in January 2005, after which he was given the shirt of striker Didier Drogba. He scored one goal for Scunthorpe in 2004–05, in which he made 24 appearances, as they won promotion to League One as League Two runners-up. He signed a new six-month contract with the club in June 2005.

Rankine rejoined former club Barrow in August 2005 on a one-month loan, and after scoring two goals, the loan was extended for a second month in September. During the second month, he was recalled by Scunthorpe, due to injuries at the club, meaning he finished the loan period with 11 appearances and three goals. He was reported to have joined Lincoln City on trial in December, but this claim was rejected by Lincoln manager Keith Alexander. Following the expiry of his Scunthorpe contract on 9 December 2005, he later joined Conference National club Altrincham on trial and scored for their reserve team.

=== Alfreton Town and Rushden & Diamonds ===
After his contract at Scunthorpe expired, he had a period with former club Armthorpe Welfare to help his fitness, before joining Alfreton Town of the Conference North in January 2006. He finished 2005–06 with 22 appearances and three goals for Alfreton, after which he was offered a new contract in May 2006. However, Rankine signed for Conference National club Rushden & Diamonds on 24 July 2006 on a one-year contract, having been on trial for three weeks. He made his debut in a 1–0 defeat to Crawley Town on 12 August 2006, which was followed by his first goal in the following match three days later, converting a Glenn Wilson cross in a 3–1 defeat to Grays Athletic. He next scored with two goals in a 3–1 victory over League One club Yeovil Town in the FA Cup first round in November. He signed a new two-year contract with Rushden in March 2007, which contracted him at the club until the summer of 2009, with the option of a further two years. He scored two goals in the last five minutes against Weymouth on 3 April to help Rushden to a 4–1 victory. He finished 2006–07 with 46 appearances and 10 goals for Rushden.

Rankine played for Rushden in the Conference League Cup Final against Aldershot Town on 3 April 2008, and scored a goal during the first minute of stoppage time in extra time, ensuring a 3–3 draw and a penalty shoot-out, which Rushden lost 4–3. He finished 2007–08 with 52 appearances and 15 goals for Rushden. He joined League Two club AFC Bournemouth on 8 October 2008 on a one-month loan, after having made eight appearances for Rushden up to that point during 2008–09. He made his debut in a 0–0 draw with Rotherham United three days later before finishing the loan period with four appearances. Bournemouth were hoping to extend the loan, but Rushden wanted him to return. He scored two goals for Rushden in a 9–0 victory over Weymouth on 20 February 2009, who had been forced to field a youth team. He finished 2008–09 with 38 appearances and eight goals for Rushden.

=== York City ===
Rankine signed for Rushden's Conference Premier rivals York City on 12 June 2009 on a two-year contract for a fee of £10,000, with York's Craig Farrell moving in the opposite direction. He made his debut in a 2–1 defeat to Oxford United on 8 August 2009. He scored his first goal for York after winning and scoring a penalty kick in a 2–0 victory over Forest Green Rovers on 15 August. He played in both legs of York's play-off semi-final victory over Luton Town, which finished 2–0 on aggregate. He started in the 2010 Conference Premier play-off final at Wembley Stadium on 16 May 2010, being substituted on 70 minutes, which was lost 3–1 to Oxford. He finished 2009–10 with 55 appearances and 10 goals for York.

Rankine made his first appearance of 2010–11 in the opening match, a 2–1 defeat to Kidderminster Harriers on 14 August 2010, as a substitute in the 65th minute and scoring a penalty in the 86th minute. His first goals of the season from open play came after scoring twice in a 3–0 victory over Altrincham on 28 August 2010. Rankine finished the season as York's top scorer with 14 goals in 48 appearances.

=== Aldershot Town and Grimsby Town ===
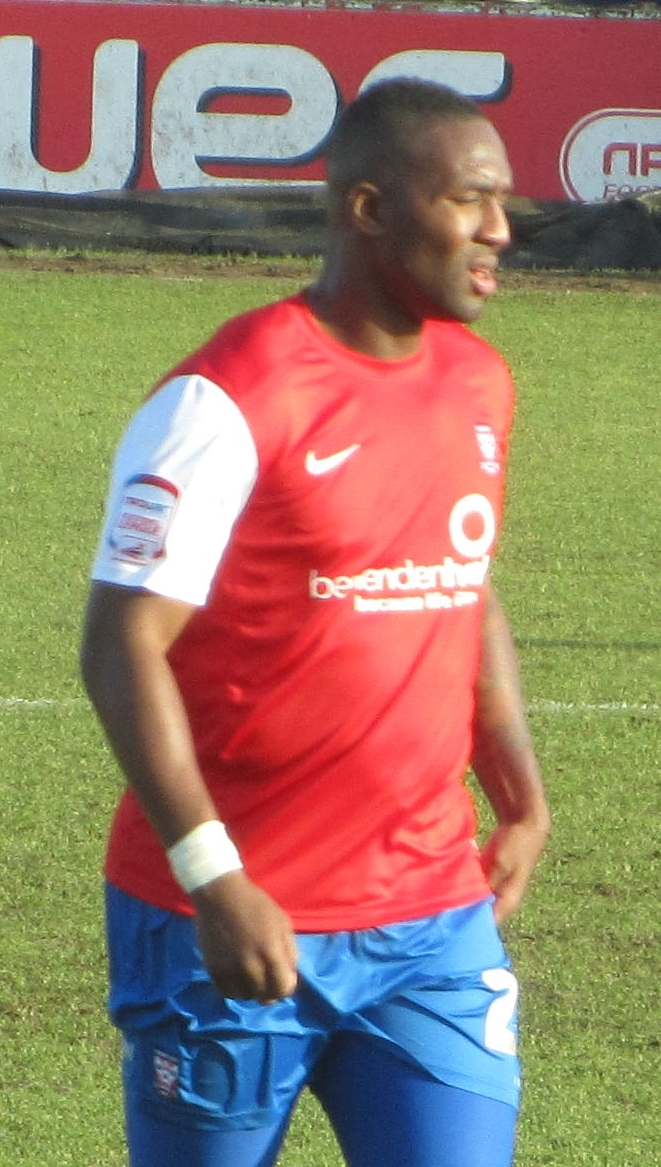
Rankine playing for York City in 2013

He rejected a new contract with York during 2010–11 and manager Gary Mills confirmed he was to leave the club to sign for League Two club Aldershot Town. He agreed to sign for Aldershot on 12 May 2011 on a free transfer.

Rankine signed for Conference Premier club Grimsby Town on 23 November 2012 on a one-month loan. He made his debut a day later as a 66th-minute substitute in Grimsby's 0–0 home draw with Buxton in the FA Trophy first round. Rankine returned to Aldershot on 4 January 2013 as he wanted a more long-term extension to his loan at Grimsby, who were only offering a one-month extension. He had made six appearances for Grimsby. On 12 February 2013, Rankine returned to former club York, by this time playing in League Two, on loan until the end of 2012–13. He made his first appearance since returning later that day, playing in York's 0–0 home draw with Gillingham. Rankine was sent back to Aldershot on 4 April 2013 having been deemed surplus to requirements by new manager Nigel Worthington. He had made eight appearances for York. He finished the season with two goals in 28 appearances for Aldershot as they were relegated to the Conference Premier.

=== Hereford United ===
He joined Tamworth on trial in July 2013, scoring in the club's 2–0 friendly win over Atherstone Town. Shortly afterwards, he signed for Conference Premier club Hereford United on a one-year contract following a trial. He made his debut in Hereford's 1–1 draw at home to Braintree Town in the opening match of 2013–14 on 10 August 2013. Rankine scored his first goal for Hereford with the equalising goal in the 70th minute of a 2–2 draw away to Hyde on 17 August 2013. He scored an 88th-minute winner for Hereford in a 2–1 away win over Aldershot, a result that saw the club avoid relegation on goal difference. However, Hereford were later expelled from the Football Conference and he commented that the situation at the club was "embarrassing" and a "disgrace". He had made 34 appearances and scored seven goals for Hereford in the 2013–14 season.

=== Gateshead ===
Rankine signed for Conference Premier club Gateshead, managed by his former Alfreton and York manager Mills, on 30 June 2014 on a one-year contract. He made his debut on 13 September 2014 as a 61st-minute substitute in a 1–0 win against Dartford, and scored his first goal for the club with a close-range finished from a Carl Finnigan cross in the 86th minute of a 2–2 extra time draw to Wrexham in the FA Trophy third round on 7 February 2015, with Gateshead losing 5–3 in a penalty shoot-out. Rankine made 36 appearances and scored five goals in 2014–15 as Gateshead finished 10th in the Conference Premier.

=== Altrincham ===
Rankine signed for National League club Altrincham on 3 June 2015, leaving Gateshead as he was unhappy with how regularly he was playing there. He made his debut in a 1–0 home defeat to Forest Green on 8 August 2015 and scored his first goal with a looping header from a James Lawrie cross in the 29th minute of a 2–1 home victory over Tranmere Rovers on 29 August. Rankine finished 2015–16 with 15 goals from 45 appearances as Altrincham were relegated in 22nd place in the National League.

=== Guiseley ===
Rankine signed for National League club Guiseley on 26 May 2016.

=== Return to York City ===
Rankine signed for newly relegated National League North club York City on 16 June 2017 on a one-year contract, marking his third spell with the club. He scored two goals from eight appearances as York finished 2017–18 in 11th place in the table. He was released at the end of the season.

== Style of play ==
Rankine played as a striker and was described as a target man, not being a prolific goalscorer, and he said "I just like to chip away and work as hard as I can and, hopefully, then you get rewarded with goals". He had the "ability to hold the ball up, and cause the defenders problems" and possessed the long throw-in ability. After Rankine signed for Bournemouth, manager Jimmy Quinn said "He's big, he's strong and I'm pleased to get him in". York manager Martin Foyle said that Rankine "will also work hard, close down and give us a presence in the final third. He's a good size, mobile and will certainly run the channels."

== Personal life ==
Rankine is the nephew of former player Mark Rankine and cousin of Tottenham Hotspur's Danny Rose. He has one child, a boy. He was arrested along with York players Michael Gash, Michael Ingham and Craig Nelthorpe in August 2009 following an incident involving two other men at a Subway outlet on a night out. The four appeared at York Magistrates' Court on 14 January 2010 after being charged with affray. Rankine denied a charge of affray and instead pleaded guilty to a lesser charge after appearing at York Crown Court on 1 September.

Rankine retired from playing football in 2018 and began working as an intermediary, helping players transition from non-League to professional football.

== Career statistics ==
Appearances and goals by club, season and competition
Club	Season	League			FA Cup		League Cup		Other		Total	
Club	Season	Division	Apps	Goals	Apps	Goals	Apps	Goals	Apps	Goals	Apps	Goals
Barrow	2003–04	Northern Premier League Premier Division	37	7	2	1	—		8	1	47	9
Barrow	2004–05	Conference North	11	3	—		—		—		11	3
Barrow	Total		48	10	2	1	—		8	1	58	12
Scunthorpe United	2004–05	League Two	21	1	2	0	—		1 (Note: Appearance in Football League Trophy)	0	24	1
Barrow (loan)	2005–06	Conference North	11	3	1	0	—		—		12	3
Alfreton Town	2005–06	Conference North	22	3	—		—		—		22	3
Rushden & Diamonds	2006–07	Conference National	40	7	3	2	—		3 (Note: Appearance(s) in FA Trophy)	1	46	10
Rushden & Diamonds	2007–08	Conference Premier	42	12	3	1	—		7 (Note: Four appearances in FA Trophy, three appearances and two goals in Conference League Cup)	2	52	15
Rushden & Diamonds	2008–09	Conference Premier	35	7	—		—		3	1	38	8
Rushden & Diamonds	Total		117	26	6	3	—		13	4	136	33
AFC Bournemouth (loan)	2008–09	League Two	3	0	—		—		1	0	4	0
York City	2009–10	Conference Premier	43	8	4	2	—		8 (Note: Five appearances in FA Trophy, three in Conference Premier play-offs)	0	55	10
York City	2010–11	Conference Premier	42	12	5	2	—		1	0	48	14
York City	Total		85	20	9	4	—		9	0	103	24
Aldershot Town	2011–12	League Two	22	2	3	1	4	2	1	0	30	5
Aldershot Town	2012–13	League Two	24	1	2	0	1	1	1	0	28	2
Aldershot Town	Total		46	3	5	1	5	3	2	0	58	7
Grimsby Town (loan)	2012–13	Conference Premier	3	0	—		—		3	0	6	0
York City (loan)	2012–13	League Two	8	0	—		—		—		8	0
Hereford United	2013–14	Conference Premier	31	7	2	0	—		1	0	34	7
Gateshead	2014–15	Conference Premier	31	4	2	0	—		3	1	36	5
Altrincham	2015–16	National League	40	12	2	1	—		3	2	45	15
Guiseley	2016–17	National League	39	6	2	0	—		2	2	43	8
York City	2017–18	National League North	8	2	0	0	—		0	0	8	2
Career total			513	97	33	10	5	3	46	10	597	120
