= Liam Darville =

English footballer

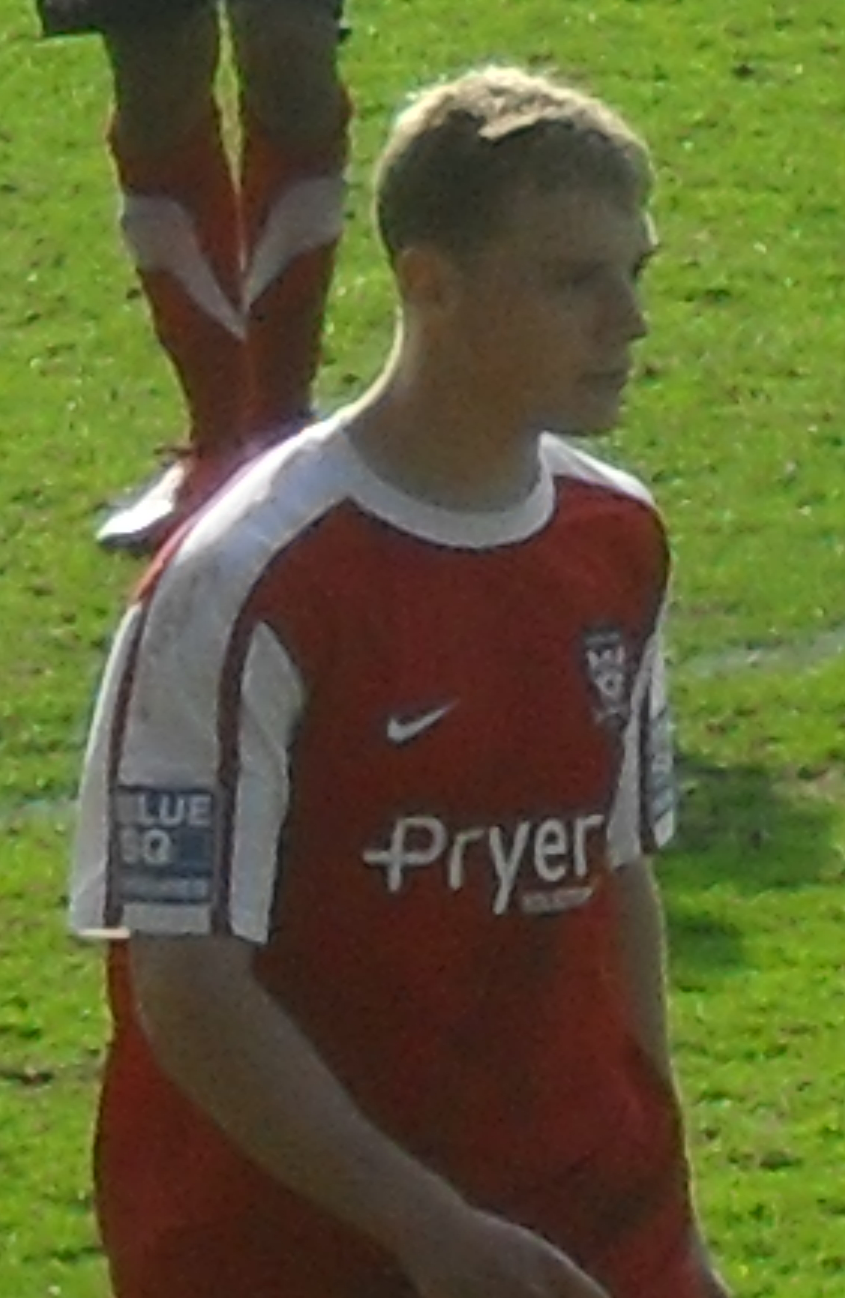
- Darville playing for York City in 2011

Personal information
- Full name: Liam Thomas Darville
- Date of birth: 26 October 1990 (age 36)
- Place of birth: Leyburn, England
- Position: Defender

Youth career
- –2010: Leeds United

Senior career*
| Years | Team | Apps | (Gls) |
| 2010–2011 | Leeds United | 0 | (0) |
| 2010 | → Rotherham United (loan) | 0 | (0) |
| 2010–2011 | → Tranmere Rovers (loan) | 9 | (0) |
| 2011 | York City | 17 | (0) |
| 2011 | Harrogate Town | 13 | (0) |
| 2011– | Richmond Town | | |

International career
| 2006 | England U16 | 1 | (0) |
| 2006–2007 | England U17 | 9 | (0) |
- * Club domestic league appearances and goals as of 20:53, 4 January 2012 (UTC)

Liam Thomas Darville (born 26 October 1990) is an English semi-professional footballer who plays as a defender. He has previously played for Leeds United, Rotherham United, Tranmere Rovers, York City and Harrogate Town. He represented England at under-16 and under-17 levels.

== Club career ==
=== Leeds United ===
Born in Leyburn, North Yorkshire, Darville came through the youth system at Leeds United, but only managed to play reserve-team football for the club. He joined League Two club Rotherham United on 25 March 2010 on loan, but he picked up an injury soon after joining and was unable to feature for the first team.

In July 2010, Leeds allowed him to play in some of Conference Premier club York City's pre-season friendlies. Following a trial, he joined League One club Tranmere Rovers on 5 August 2010 on a one-month emergency loan. He made his debut on 7 August 2010 in a 2–1 defeat at home to Oldham Athletic. After impressing in his first three appearances, his loan was extended until January 2011. He finished the loan with 13 appearances after it expired on 4 January 2011.

=== York City ===
Darville left Leeds on 17 January 2011 by mutual consent before signing for York City on 31 January on a contract until the end of the 2010–11 season. He made his debut the following day in a 4–1 home win over league leaders AFC Wimbledon. He finished the season with 17 appearances for York before being released at the end of the season.

=== Harrogate Town ===
After having an unsuccessful trial with League Two club Accrington Stanley in July 2011, Darville signed for Conference North club Harrogate Town on 9 September, making his debut the following day in a 2–0 home victory over Gloucester City. He was released by the club on 13 December 2011 after making 16 appearances. He signed for Richmond Town of the Teesside Football League the following day, playing alongside his older brother Ben.

== International career ==
Darville was capped by the England under-16 team and was part of the squad which won the Victory Shield and participated in the Montaigu Tournament. He was capped once at this level, having started in a 2–1 victory away at Belgium on 22 February 2006, in which he was substituted in the 41st minute for James Reid. He later represented the under-17 team, making his debut after starting in a 4–2 home victory over Sweden on 31 July 2006. Darville played for the under-17s at the Algarve Tournament and finished his period with the team with nine caps. He was called up to the under-18 team for a match against Austria in April 2008.

== Career statistics ==
As of match played 10 December 2011

Appearances and goals by club, season and competition
| Club | Season | League | | | FA Cup | | League Cup | | Other | | Total | |
| Club | Season | Division | Apps | Goals | Apps | Goals | Apps | Goals | Apps | Goals | Apps | Goals |
|---|---|---|---|---|---|---|---|---|---|---|---|---|
| Leeds United | 2009–10 | League One | 0 | 0 | 0 | 0 | 0 | 0 | 0 | 0 | 0 | 0 |
| Leeds United | 2010–11 | Championship | 0 | 0 | 0 | 0 | — | | — | | 0 | 0 |
| Leeds United | Total | | 0 | 0 | 0 | 0 | 0 | 0 | 0 | 0 | 0 | 0 |
| Rotherham United (loan) | 2009–10 | League Two | 0 | 0 | — | | — | | — | | 0 | 0 |
| Tranmere Rovers (loan) | 2010–11 | League One | 9 | 0 | 0 | 0 | 2 | 0 | 2 (Note: Appearances in Football League Trophy) | 0 | 13 | 0 |
| York City | 2010–11 | Conference Premier | 17 | 0 | — | | — | | — | | 17 | 0 |
| Harrogate Town | 2011–12 | Conference North | 13 | 0 | 2 | 0 | — | | 1 (Note: Appearance in FA Trophy) | 0 | 16 | 0 |
| Career total | | | 39 | 0 | 2 | 0 | 2 | 0 | 3 | 0 | 46 | 0 |
