= David McDermott =

English footballer (1988–2026)

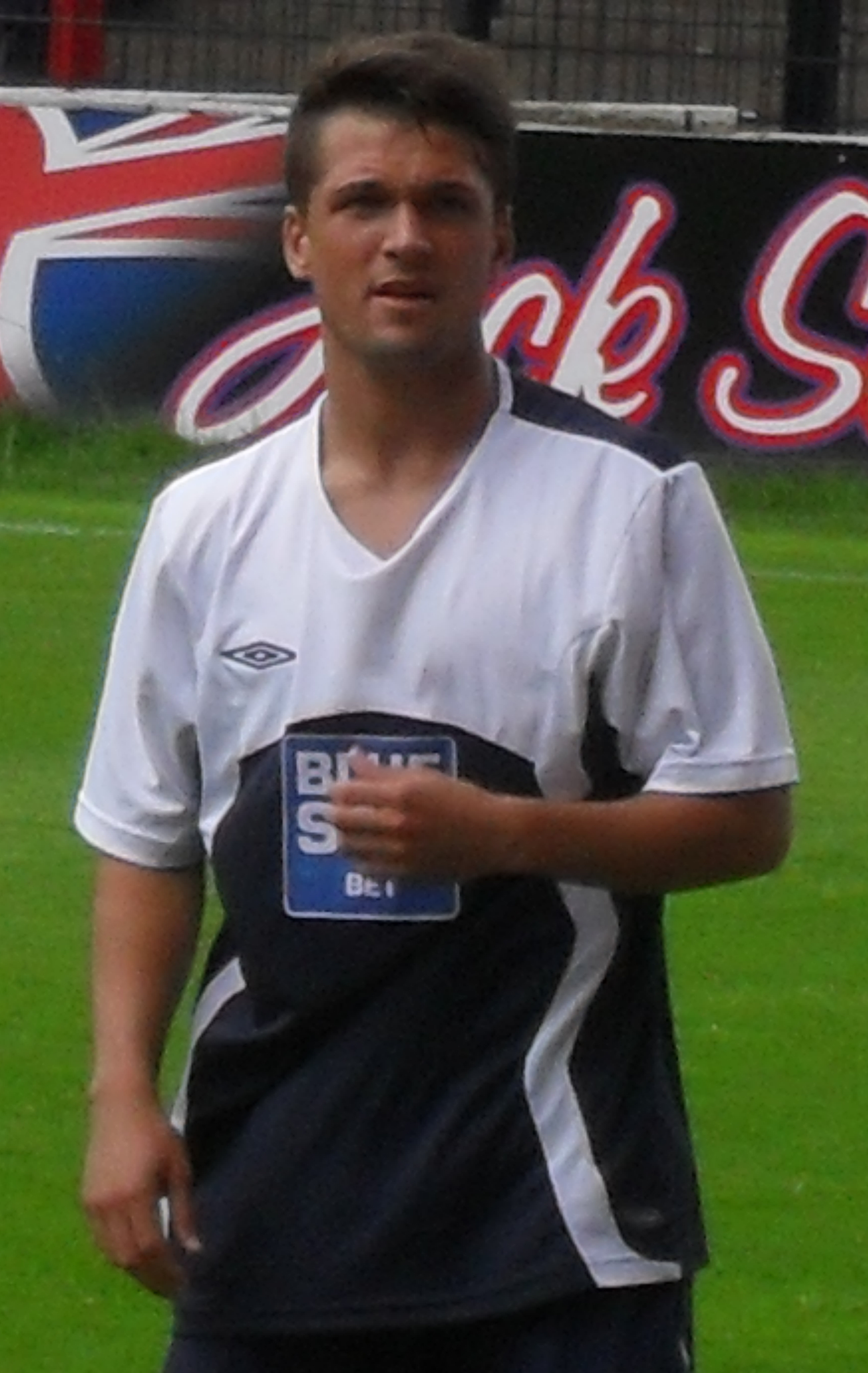
- McDermott training with York City in 2011

Personal information
- Full name: David Anthony McDermott
- Date of birth: 6 February 1988
- Place of birth: Stourbridge, England
- Date of death: c. 2 September 2026 (aged 38)
- Height: 5 ft 6 in (1.68 m)
- Position: Winger

Youth career
- –2004: Walsall

Senior career*
| Years | Team | Apps | (Gls) |
| 2004–2008 | Walsall | 14 | (0) |
| 2007 | → Halesowen Town (loan) | 4 | (2) |
| 2008–2010 | Kidderminster Harriers | 46 | (1) |
| 2010 | → Halesowen Town (loan) | 5 | (2) |
| 2010–2012 | York City | 17 | (1) |
| 2012 | AFC Telford United | 0 | (0) |
| 2012 | Stourbridge | | |
| 2012–2014 | Rushall Olympic | | |
| 2014–2015 | Worcester City | 8 | (0) |
| 2016 | Redditch United | | |
| 2017 | Hednesford Town | 1 | (1) |
- * Club domestic league appearances and goals

David Anthony McDermott (6 February 1988 – c. 2 September 2026) was an English professional footballer who played as a winger.

He started his career at Walsall, becoming their youngest ever debutant aged 16 in 2004. He went on to play for them in the Football League before playing for Kidderminster Harriers and York City in the Conference Premier. He also later played for several lower league clubs.

== Career ==
=== Walsall ===
Born in Stourbridge, West Midlands, on 6 February 1988, McDermott progressed through the Walsall youth system and he earned a scholarship place ahead of the 2004–05 season. He made his first team debut in a 1–0 defeat to Sheffield Wednesday in the League Cup after entering the game as a substitute in the 77th minute on 25 August 2004, which was his only appearance of the 2004–05 season, but became the Saddlers' youngest ever debutant at 16 years old.

He finished the 2005–06 season with three appearances and he signed his first professional contract with Walsall in May 2006. He joined Southern League Premier Division club Halesowen Town on an initial one-month loan on 4 January 2007, where he made four appearances and scored two goals. He finished the 2007–08 season with 15 appearances for Walsall and he was released by the club on 7 May 2008.

=== Kidderminster Harriers ===
McDermott joined Conference Premier club Kidderminster Harriers on a free transfer in August following a trial. He made his debut in a 1–1 draw against Lewes as an 80th-minute substitute on 9 August. He finished the 2008–09 season with 29 appearances and one goal for Kidderminster and he signed a new one-year contract in July 2009. McDermott was re-signed by Halesowen on an initial one-month loan on 17 February 2010 to try to regain full fitness. He finished the loan in March with five appearances and two goals. He was invited back to pre-season training by Kidderminster after he finished the 2009–10 season with 25 appearances and one goal.

=== York City ===
McDermott joined fellow Conference Premier team York City on trial in July 2010 and he played in a 1–0 pre-season friendly defeat to Hull City, with manager Martin Foyle saying he was impressed by McDermott's performance. Ahead of the 2–0 friendly defeat to Barnsley in which McDermott featured, Foyle spoke to the player's agent ahead of deciding over offering him a contract. After scoring from a "weakly struck" direct free kick to score the winning goal in a 1–0 friendly victory over Morecambe, McDermott was offered a contract with York and he signed for the club on 28 July 2010. He made his debut as an 82nd-minute substitute in a 2–2 draw at Bath City on 21 August 2010. Having made four appearances for the club, McDermott was released by York on 5 October 2010 before being re-signed on another month-to-month contract on 19 October by new manager Gary Mills. His first appearance since returning was in a 2–0 victory at Kidderminster in the FA Cup fourth qualifying round on 23 October 2010, which was also his first start for York. McDermott scored his first goal for York in a 2–0 victory over Southport on 23 November. He agreed a new contract with York on 27 December 2010 that would keep him at the club until the end of the 2010–11 season, which would be signed in January 2011.

Despite having yet to agree terms on a new contract he was invited back to pre-season training with York, before re-signing on non-contract terms on 1 July 2011. He suffered a foot injury during a 1–1 draw with Garforth Town in pre-season on 11 July 2011, which required an X-ray. By October 2011, Mills was looking to loan McDermott out in order for him to play regular first team football.

=== Telford United ===
Having been unable to break into the first team at York, McDermott left the club on 6 January 2012 and subsequently went on trial with fellow Conference Premier club AFC Telford United. He signed for AFC Telford on non-contract terms on 6 February 2012 but did not make any appearances for them.

=== Later career ===
McDermott joined Southern League Premier Division side Stourbridge for the rest of the 2011–12 season, before signing for Northern Premier League Premier Division club Rushall Olympic on 29 September 2012. He played for Rushall for the next two seasons, 2012–13 and 2013–14. He joined Conference North team Worcester City on 7 August 2014, for short stint which included 10 appearances and an away first round proper FA Cup surprise win at the Ricoh Arena against Coventry City.

He also had a spell at Redditch United in 2016, and Hednesford Town a year later.

== Death ==
On 2 September 2026, it was announced that McDermott had died. He was 38.

== Career statistics ==
Appearances and goals by club, season and competition
| Club | Season | League | | | FA Cup | | League Cup | | Other | | Total | |
| Club | Season | Division | Apps | Goals | Apps | Goals | Apps | Goals | Apps | Goals | Apps | Goals |
|---|---|---|---|---|---|---|---|---|---|---|---|---|
| Walsall | 2004–05 | League One | 0 | 0 | 0 | 0 | 1 | 0 | 0 | 0 | 1 | 0 |
| Walsall | 2005–06 | League One | 1 | 0 | 1 | 0 | 0 | 0 | 1 (Note: Appearance in Football League Trophy) | 0 | 3 | 0 |
| Walsall | 2006–07 | League Two | 0 | 0 | 0 | 0 | 0 | 0 | 0 | 0 | 0 | 0 |
| Walsall | 2007–08 | League One | 13 | 0 | 1 | 0 | 0 | 0 | 1 | 0 | 15 | 0 |
| Walsall | Total | | 14 | 0 | 2 | 0 | 1 | 0 | 2 | 0 | 19 | 0 |
| Halesowen Town (loan) | 2006–07 | Southern League Premier Division | 4 | 2 | — | | — | | — | | 4 | 2 |
| Kidderminster Harriers | 2008–09 | Conference Premier | 23 | 0 | 1 | 0 | — | | 5 (Note: One appearance and one goal in Conference League Cup, four appearances in FA Trophy) | 1 | 29 | 1 |
| Kidderminster Harriers | 2009–10 | Conference Premier | 23 | 1 | 2 | 0 | — | | 0 | 0 | 25 | 1 |
| Kidderminster Harriers | Total | | 46 | 1 | 3 | 0 | — | | 5 | 1 | 54 | 2 |
| Halesowen Town (loan) | 2009–10 | Southern League Premier Division | 5 | 2 | — | | — | | — | | 5 | 2 |
| York City | 2010–11 | Conference Premier | 17 | 1 | 3 | 0 | — | | 1 (Note: Appearance in FA Trophy) | 0 | 21 | 1 |
| Worcester City | 2014–15 | Conference North | 8 | 0 | 1 | 0 | — | | 0 | 0 | 9 | 0 |
| Career total | | | 94 | 6 | 9 | 0 | 1 | 0 | 8 | 1 | 112 | 7 |
