= Michael Gash =

English footballer (born 1986)

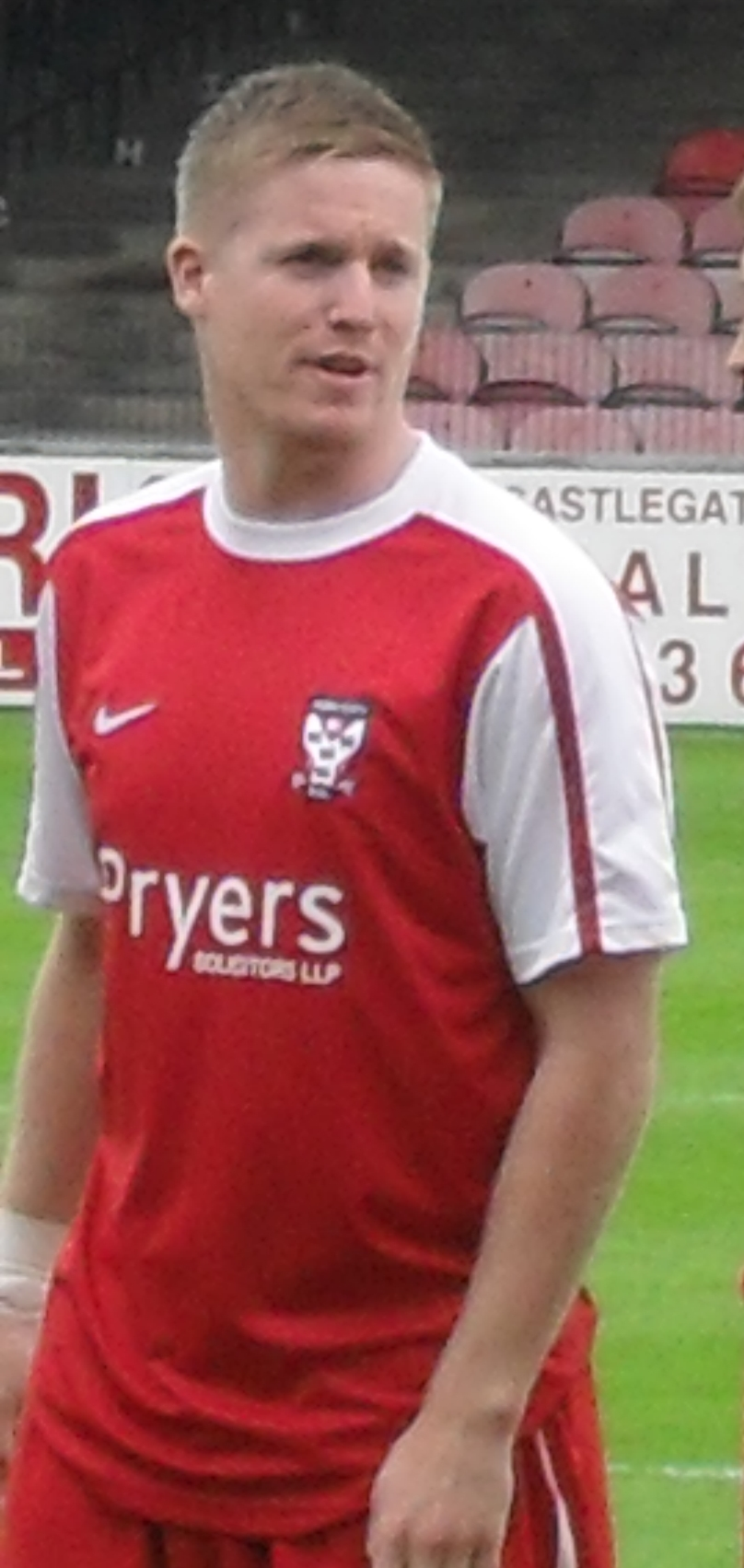
- Gash playing for York City in 2010

Personal information
- Full name: Michael Edward Gash
- Date of birth: 3 September 1986 (age 40)
- Place of birth: Rinteln, West Germany
- Height: 1.86 m (6 ft 1 in)
- Positions: Centre-back; striker

Team information
- Current team: Deeping Rangers

Youth career
- 1999–2002: Peterborough United
- 2002–2003: Cambridge United
- 2003–2005: Cambridge City

Senior career*
Years	Team	Apps	(Gls)
2003–2006	Cambridge City Reserves	36	(17)
2003–2006	Cambridge City	38	(11)
2006–2007	Cambridge United	16	(2)
2006–2007	→ Cambridge City (loan)	19	(3)
2007–2008	Cambridge City	35	(23)
2008–2009	Ebbsfleet United	40	(10)
2009–2011	York City	53	(8)
2010–2011	→ Rushden & Diamonds (loan)	18	(6)
2011–2013	Cambridge United	67	(20)
2012	→ Braintree Town (loan)	6	(1)
2013	→ Kidderminster Harriers (loan)	11	(6)
2013–2015	Kidderminster Harriers	52	(14)
2014–2015	→ Nuneaton Town (loan)	11	(1)
2015–2017	Barnet	51	(12)
2017–2021	King's Lynn Town	139	(40)
2021–2026	Peterborough Sports	163	(17)
2026	St. Ives Town	6	(4)
2026-	Deeping Rangers	0	(0)

International career
2010	England C	1	(0)

Managerial career
- 2023–2025: Peterborough Sports
- 2026: Peterborough Sports
- * Club domestic league appearances and goals as of 14:33, 26 April 2026 (UTC)

Michael Edward Gash (born 3 September 1986) is an English footballer who plays as a centre-back for Deeping Rangers. For most of his career, he has played as a striker.

Gash's nomadic career has seen him play primarily in the Football Conference, though he finally made the step up to the Football League with Barnet in 2015.

== Club career ==
Gash was born in Rinteln, Germany as his father was stationed there as a head teacher in the British Army. Gash began his career in the youth system of Cambridge City, making his first-team debut on 7 October 2003 when starting and scoring in a 12–0 home win over Waterbeach in the Cambridgeshire Invitation Cup. Upon establishing himself in the first team, a one-in-three strike rate in the 2005–06 season saw him join city rivals Cambridge United for 2006–07.

In September 2006, Gash was loaned back to the Lilywhites, having failed to hold down a first-team spot. After one season with the U's, in which he scored only two goals, Gash re-joined City on a permanent basis in July 2007. The 2007–08 season saw Gash flourish in the Conference South, scoring 27 goals in all competitions. City's demotion to the Southern League hastened his departure from the Lilywhites, and he was sold to Ebbsfleet United in August 2008 in a deal worth £20k plus a sell-on fee.

Gash's second crack at the top division of non-league football was more successful, as he scored 11 times across the course of the season, which again saw him attract transfer interest. In July 2009, MyFootballClub members voted (94.2% for, 5.8% against) to sell Gash to an unnamed bidder in a deal worth £55,000, this bidder later turned out to be York City. The deal also included a 20% sell-on, 30% of which would go to Cambridge City, who received £7,000 from the sale to the Minstermen.

Gash's spell in Yorkshire proved to be disappointing, with only 8 goals in 63 games in all competitions, though he was called up to the England C squad in September 2010. He was loaned to Rushden & Diamonds in December 2010, where he was far more successful, scoring six times in 19 games. In June 2011, Gash re-joined Cambridge United on a free transfer. After an unspectacular 2011–12 season, in which he scored 7 goals in 42 games, Gash was loaned to Braintree Town in August 2012. Following his return from loan, Gash was far more prolific, scoring 15 times in 30 games, which attracted interest from other clubs in the league – a bid from an unnamed club was rejected in January 2013. He joined Kidderminster Harriers on loan in March 2013 for the rest of the season. Director of football Jez George said, immediately following the loan agreement, that loaning out Gash was the best scenario financially for the U's, with Gash's salary demands scuppering chances of agreeing a new contract at the Abbey Stadium. Gash joined the Harriers permanently at the end of the season on a two-year deal after scoring six times in 11 games for Kiddy – taking his league tally for the season to 21 overall, making him the joint-second top scorer in the division. He scored 22 goals in 72 games for the U's.

Gash scored 15 goals in 42 games during his first full season as a Kidderminster player, including two goals in a 4–2 win over Newport County in the FA Cup second round, which earned him the Player of the Round award from The Football Association, as well the opener in their away upset win over Peterborough United in round three. The following season, Gash scored only three goals in 17 games between August and November and was loaned out to Nuneaton Town with Harriers needing to reduce their wage bill. He scored only once in 11 games for the Boro, and following the expiry of his loan, left Kidderminster by mutual consent in January 2015.

Six days later, Gash joined Barnet, despite manager Martin Allen stating that "He has got an attitude, there is no doubt about it, and I do not think it is always a good one... I told him straight exactly what his position would be – it would be sub." Less than a month later, following his performance in a home win over Woking, Allen then said that "He is a better player than I thought, to be honest. I always thought he was half decent but in training the last couple of weeks he has lost a lot of weight and improved his level of fitness. He is a tremendous character around the group and he is a good player."

Gash signed a new one-year deal at Barnet for the 2015–16 season. He made his Football League debut against Leyton Orient on 8 August 2015. Following four goals in five games in September, Gash was named League Two Player of the Month. In August 2016, Gash injured his cruciate ligament, putting him out for the rest of the season, and he was released following the expiry of his contract.

In an effort to get his career back on track, he signed for King's Lynn Town of the seventh tier of the English football pyramid in July 2017. After 14 goals in his first season, in which the Linnets lost the Southern Football League play-off final to Slough Town, Gash scored nine league goals in his second season and followed this up with a goal in the Southern League Premier Central play-off final win against Alvechurch, and then scored the winner in extra time in the super play-off against Warrington Town to secure promotion to the National League North. After four seasons at the club that included back-to-back promotions as King's Lynn reached the fifth tier of English football for the first time, Gash departed the club at the end of the 2020–21 season, citing his full time job as a tree-surgeon as the reason for not wanting to continue his time with the club. In his last match for the club he scored in a dramatic 4–4 draw with Aldershot Town.

Gash signed for Southern League Premier Division Central side Peterborough Sports on 8 June 2021. Following a recommendation from his great friend and mentor, Jonny Hansen, Gash took the vacant managerial role at Sports alongside former Manchester United and Panathinaikos goalkeeper Luke Steele. Following a poor start to the 2025–26 season that saw the club sitting bottom of the league with four points from eight matches, Gash and Steele were sacked. In March 2026, he was once again appointed manager. Following relegation, he departed his role as both player and manager at the end of the 2025–26 season.

== International career ==
Gash was capped once by the England national C team, in a 2–2 away draw with Wales on 5 September 2010.

== Career statistics ==
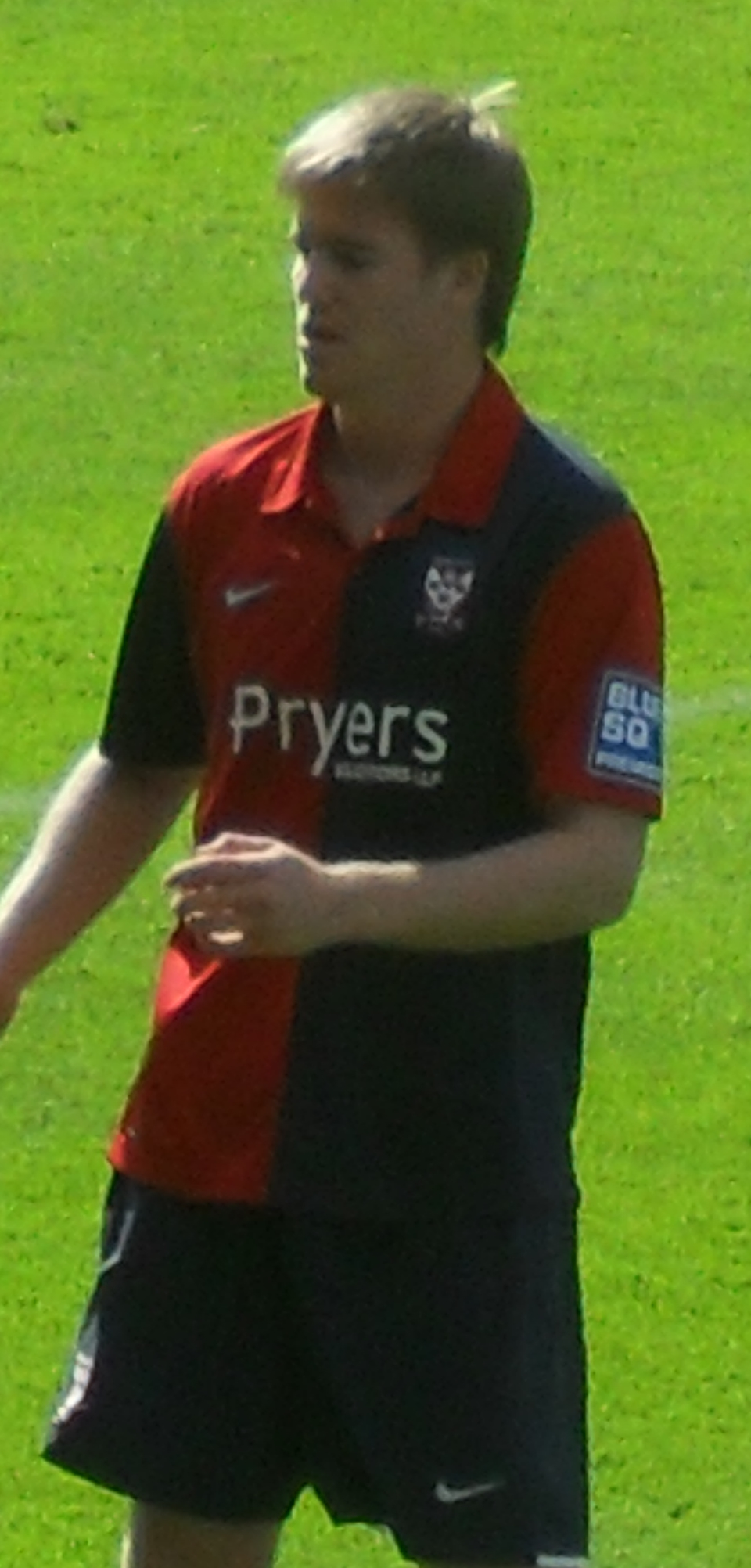
Gash playing for York City in 2009

As of 20 August 2022

Appearances and goals by club, season and competition
Club	Season	League			FA Cup		League Cup		Other		Total	
Club	Season	Division	Apps	Goals	Apps	Goals	Apps	Goals	Apps	Goals	Apps	Goals
Cambridge City Reserves	2003–04	ECFL Division One	24	12	—		—		3 (Note: Appearances in Eastern Counties Football League League Cup)	4	27	16
Cambridge City Reserves	2005–06	ECFL Premier Division	12	5	—		—		2	1	14	6
Cambridge City Reserves	Total		36	17	—		—		5	5	41	22
Cambridge City	2003–04	Southern League Premier Division	0	0	1	0	—		3 (Note: One appearance and one goal in Cambridgeshire Invitation Cup, one appearance in FA Trophy, one in Southern Football League Cup)	1	4	1
Cambridge City	2004–05	Conference South	17	4	0	0	—		9 (Note: One appearance in Conference Cup, four appearances and one goal in FA Trophy, three appearances and one goal in Cambridgeshire Invitation Cup, one appearance in Conference South play-offs)	2	26	6
Cambridge City	2005–06	Conference South	21	7	5	1	—		4 (Note: Appearance(s) in FA Trophy)	2	30	10
Cambridge City	Total		38	11	6	1	—		16	5	60	17
Cambridge United	2006–07	Conference National	16	2	1	0	—		1	0	18	2
Cambridge City (loan)	2006–07	Conference South	19	3	—		—		3 (Note: Appearances in Cambridgeshire Invitation Cup)	3	22	6
Cambridge City	2007–08	Conference South	35	23	2	1	—		6 (Note: One appearance in Conference League Cup, three appearances and one goal in FA Trophy, two appearances and one goal in Cambridgeshire Invitation Cup)	2	43	26
Cambridge City	Total		54	26	2	1	—		9	5	65	32
Ebbsfleet United	2008–09	Conference Premier	40	10	3	0	—		8 (Note: One appearance in Conference League Cup, seven appearances and two goals in FA Trophy)	2	51	12
York City	2009–10	Conference Premier	36	7	1	0	—		9 (Note: Six appearances in FA Trophy, three in Conference Premier play-offs)	0	46	7
York City	2010–11	Conference Premier	17	1	1	0	—		0	0	18	1
York City	Total		53	8	2	0	—		9	0	64	8
Rushden & Diamonds (loan)	2010–11	Conference Premier	18	6	—		—		—		18	6
Cambridge United	2011–12	Conference Premier	40	7	3	0	—		1	0	44	7
Cambridge United	2012–13	Conference Premier	27	13	1	0	—		2	1	30	14
Cambridge United	Total		67	20	4	0	—		3	1	74	21
Braintree Town (loan)	2012–13	Conference Premier	6	1	—		—		—		6	1
Kidderminster Harriers (loan)	2012–13	Conference Premier	11	6	—		—		2 (Note: Appearances in Conference Premier play-offs)	1	13	7
Kidderminster Harriers	2013–14	Conference Premier	36	11	5	3	—		1	1	42	15
Kidderminster Harriers	2014–15	Conference Premier	16	3	1	0	—		—		17	3
Kidderminster Harriers	Total		63	20	6	3	—		3	2	72	25
Nuneaton Town (loan)	2014–15	Conference Premier	11	1	—		—		—		11	1
Barnet	2014–15	Conference Premier	15	3	—		—		—		15	3
Barnet	2015–16	League Two	34	9	2	1	1	0	0	0	37	10
Barnet	2016–17	League Two	2	0	0	0	1	0	0	0	3	0
Barnet	Total		51	12	2	1	2	0	0	0	55	13
King's Lynn Town	2017–18	Southern League Premier Division	42	14	2	0	—		3 (Note: One appearance in FA Trophy, two appearances in Southern Football League play-offs)	0	47	14
King's Lynn Town	2018–19	Southern League Premier Division Central	37	9	1	0	—		5 (Note: Two appearances and one goal in FA Trophy, two appearances and one goal in Southern Football League play-offs, one appearance and one goal in Step 3 super play-offs)	3	43	12
King's Lynn Town	2019–20	National League North	31	10	1	0	—		2	0	34	10
King's Lynn Town	2020–21	National League	29	7	1	0	—		1	0	31	7
King's Lynn Town	Total		139	40	5	0	0	0	11	3	155	40
Peterborough Sports	2021–22	Southern League Premier Division Central	33	5	3	1	—		2 (Note: One appearance in Northamptonshire Senior Cup, one appearance in Southern Football League play-offs)	0	38	6
Peterborough Sports	2022–23	National League North	4	1	0	0	—		0	0	4	1
Peterborough Sports	Total		37	6	3	1	0	0	2	0	42	7
Career total			632	186	34	7	2	0	67	23	732	216

== Honours ==
Barnet

- Conference Premier: 2014–15
