= Transfer market =

Market for the transfer of football players

In some sports, notably association football, the transfer market is the arena in which football players are available for transfer to clubs.

The transfer market consists of a list of players available for transfer, and also the money moving between clubs as they contest to purchase and sell these players. For example, a club may be described as having "money to spend on the transfer market." or the market may be described in similar ways to the stock market. The European transfer market is open between the end of the season and 31 August, and again for a short period in midwinter, the 'transfer window'. During the transfer window clubs buy replacements for players who have suffered injuries or strengthen their squads in preparation either for an attempt to advance in a tournament or in anticipation of an upcoming struggle against relegation.

== Transfer list ==
If a player is "put on the transfer list", the club which owns the player has indicated their availability. Other clubs are then able to approach the owning club to bid for the player in an attempt to sign them. Though clubs can approach other clubs to put in a bid for a player, they know that a player on the 'transfer list' can be purchased for a more reasonable price as the club are willing to sell the player.

The Professional Footballers' Association operates an unofficial transfer list for its members previously based in England in an attempt to help them find work after being released or 'transfer listed' by their clubs. Financial pressures placed on lower league clubs have led to an increase in the number of PFA members being out of work.

== Transfer request ==
A player may make a "transfer request," to leave their club before the end of their contract. In this case, the player is publicly stating their desire to move, and encouraging other clubs to make an offer for them. Due to the public nature of transfer requests, they are often used by players to air their grievances, such as frustration over contract negotiations or a clash of personality with the manager. A player may remove their request if the source of unhappiness is resolved. The club can also reject a transfer request, effectively stating their intention to reject any offer for that player.

Since the Bosman court cases, players can leave their club at the end of their contract without having to pay a fee. The effect of rejecting a transfer request has thus been weakened. Clubs are more inclined to sell the player in order to recoup some money, even if they do not wish to let the player go.

Some players have a buyout clause in their contract, enabling them to leave their club by paying the amount stipulated in the clause. This type of clause is mandatory in some countries, such as Spain. This type of clause makes a transfer request unnecessary.
