= 2009–10 York City F.C. season =

Association football club season

York City F.C.
2009–10 season
- Chairman: Jason McGill
- Manager: Martin Foyle
- Ground: Bootham Crescent
- Conference Premier: 5th
- Play-offs: Runners-up (eliminated by Oxford United)
- FA Cup: Third round (eliminated by Stoke City)
- FA Trophy: Fourth round (eliminated by Barrow)
- Top goalscorer: League: Richard Brodie (26); All: Richard Brodie (34)
- Highest home attendance: 6,204 vs Luton Town, play-offs, 29 April 2010
- Lowest home attendance: 853 vs Hinckley United, FA Trophy, 16 December 2009
- Average home league attendance: 2,664
Home colours	Away colours

The 2009–10 season was the 88th season of competitive association football and sixth season in the Football Conference played by York City Football Club, a professional football club based in York, North Yorkshire, England. Their 17th-place finish in 2008–09 meant it was their sixth successive season in the Conference Premier. The season covers the period from 1 July 2009 to 30 June 2010.

Martin Foyle made 11 signings before the summer transfer window closed, ahead of his first full season as manager. York set a new saw a new record for consecutive league wins, with eight from 14 November 2009 to 23 January 2010. They finished fifth in the table, and after beating Luton Town 2–0 on aggregate in the play-off semi-final, they lost 3–1 to Oxford United in the final at Wembley Stadium. York were eliminated from the 2009–10 FA Trophy in the fourth round by Barrow, and from the 2009–10 FA Cup in the third round by Stoke City.

25 players made at least one appearance in nationally organised first-team competition, and there were 17 different goalscorers. Defender James Meredith missed only one of the 57 competitive matches played over the season. Richard Brodie finished as leading goalscorer with 34 goals, of which 26 came in league competition, four came in the FA Cup, three came in the FA Trophy and one came in the play-offs. The winner of the Clubman of the Year award, voted for by the club's supporters, was Michael Ingham.

== Background and pre-season ==
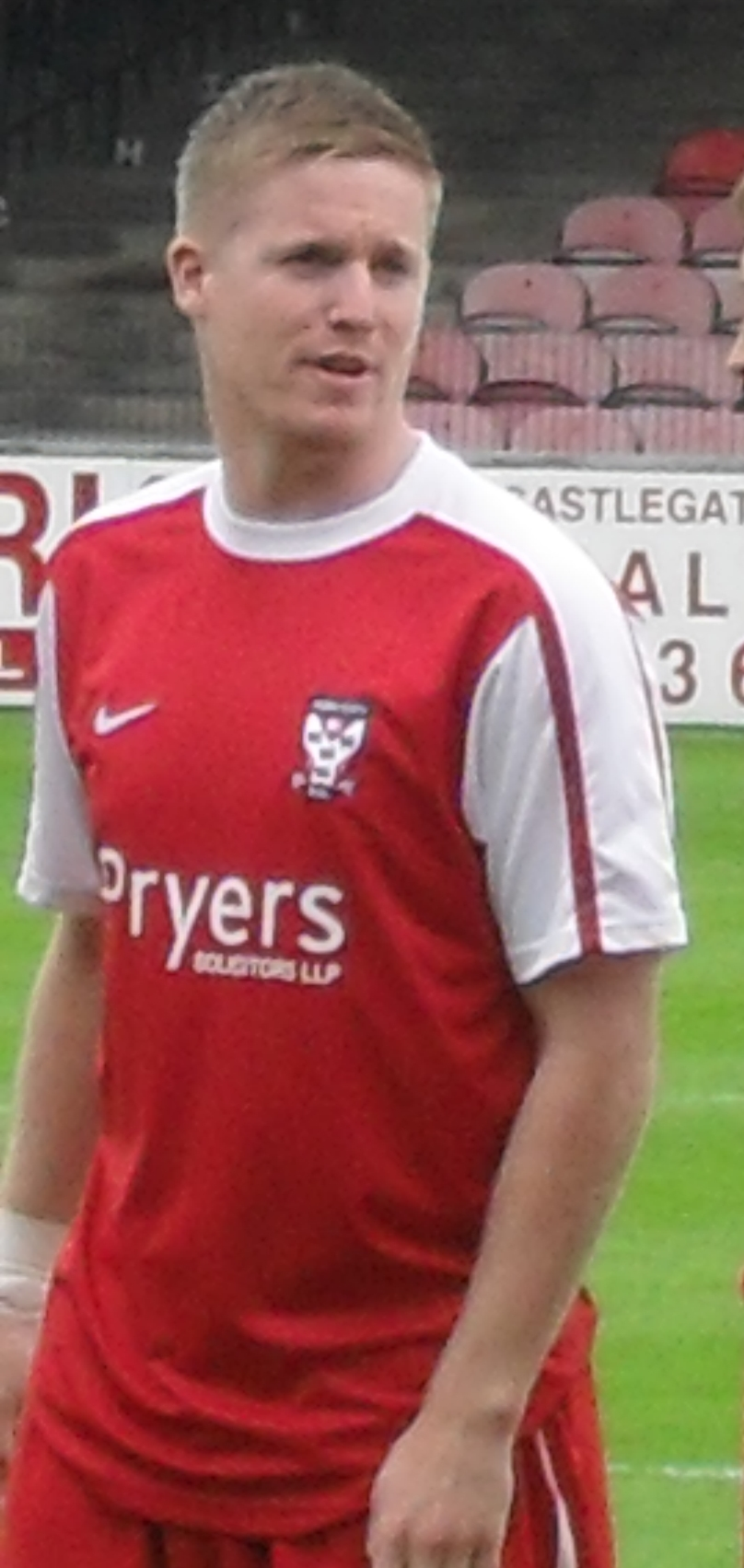
Michael Gash joined York City from Ebbsfleet United for a £55,000 fee.

Colin Walker was dismissed as manager of York City early into the 2008–09 season, and his successor was former Port Vale manager Martin Foyle. The team finished the season in 17th-place in the Conference Premier table, and were defeated 2–0 by Stevenage Borough in the 2009 FA Trophy final at Wembley Stadium. Mark Greaves, Steven Hogg, Daniel McBreen, Shaun Pejic, Josh Radcliffe, Mark Robinson, Simon Rusk, Liam Shepherd and Christian Smith and Ben Wilkinson were released by York after the season ended. Adam Boyes, Craig Farrell, Darren Kelly and Onome Sodje left for Scunthorpe United, Rushden & Diamonds, Portadown and Barnsley respectively.

Richard Brodie, Andy McWilliams, Josh Mimms and Ben Purkiss signed new contracts with York. 11 players joined before the season kicked off; defenders James Meredith from Shrewsbury Town, Alan O'Hare from Mansfield Town and Djoumin Sangaré from Salisbury City, midfielders Neil Barrett from Ebbsfleet United, Andy Ferrell from Kidderminster Harriers, Alex Lawless from Forest Green Rovers, Levi Mackin from Wrexham, winger Craig Nelthorpe from Oxford United, and strikers Michael Gash from Ebbsfleet, Richard Pacquette from Maidenhead United and Michael Rankine from Rushden. Striker Michael Emmerson was promoted from the youth team after he signed a professional contract with the club. Daniel Parslow was named as captain for the season, having taken over the role during 2008–09.

York retained the previous season's home kit, which comprised red and navy blue halved shirts with red collars, navy blue shorts and navy blue socks with two white strips on the cuffs. A new away kit was introduced, and it included light blue shirts with white horizontal stripes, light blue shorts and light blue socks. There was a change in shirt sponsor, with the name of Pryers Solicitors becoming present on the team kits.

Pre-season match details
Date	Opponents	Venue	Result	Score F–A	Scorers	Attendance	Ref.
11 July 2009	Leeds United	H	D	3–3	Smith, Lawless, Gomis (Note: Trialist)	4,774	
18 July 2009	Bradford City	H	L	0–2		1,225	
21 July 2009	North Ferriby United	A	W	6–1	Brodie 17', Denton 28' o.g., Ferrell 42', Mackin 56', Barrett (2) 61', 72'		
24 July 2009	Hartlepool United	H	W	2–0	Mackin, Jackson	764	
28 July 2009	Rotherham United	H	L	1–3	Ferrell 46'	758	
1 August 2009	FC Halifax Town	A	L	1–3	Rankine 26'	854	

== Review ==
=== August ===
York's season started with a 2–1 away defeat by Oxford, in which Brodie gave York the lead before Oxford scored two late goals. This was followed by a 0–0 home draw with Rushden, in which Rankine had a goal ruled out, as the referee had awarded a foul against Rushden. York's first win of the season came with a 2–0 home victory over Forest Green, and the goals were scored by Rankine and Adam Smith. Emmerson joined Northern League Division One club Billingham Town on a one-month loan. A second defeat of the season came after Gareth Taylor scored for Wrexham in a 1–0 away defeat. Pacquette scored the equalising goal for York in a 1–1 away draw with Hayes & Yeading United after being introduced as a substitute. The team's first away victory came with a 2–1 win against Gateshead, with goals from Brodie and Gash. Goals from Brodie (2) and Smith ensured a second successive victory of the season, after beating Histon 3–1.

=== September ===
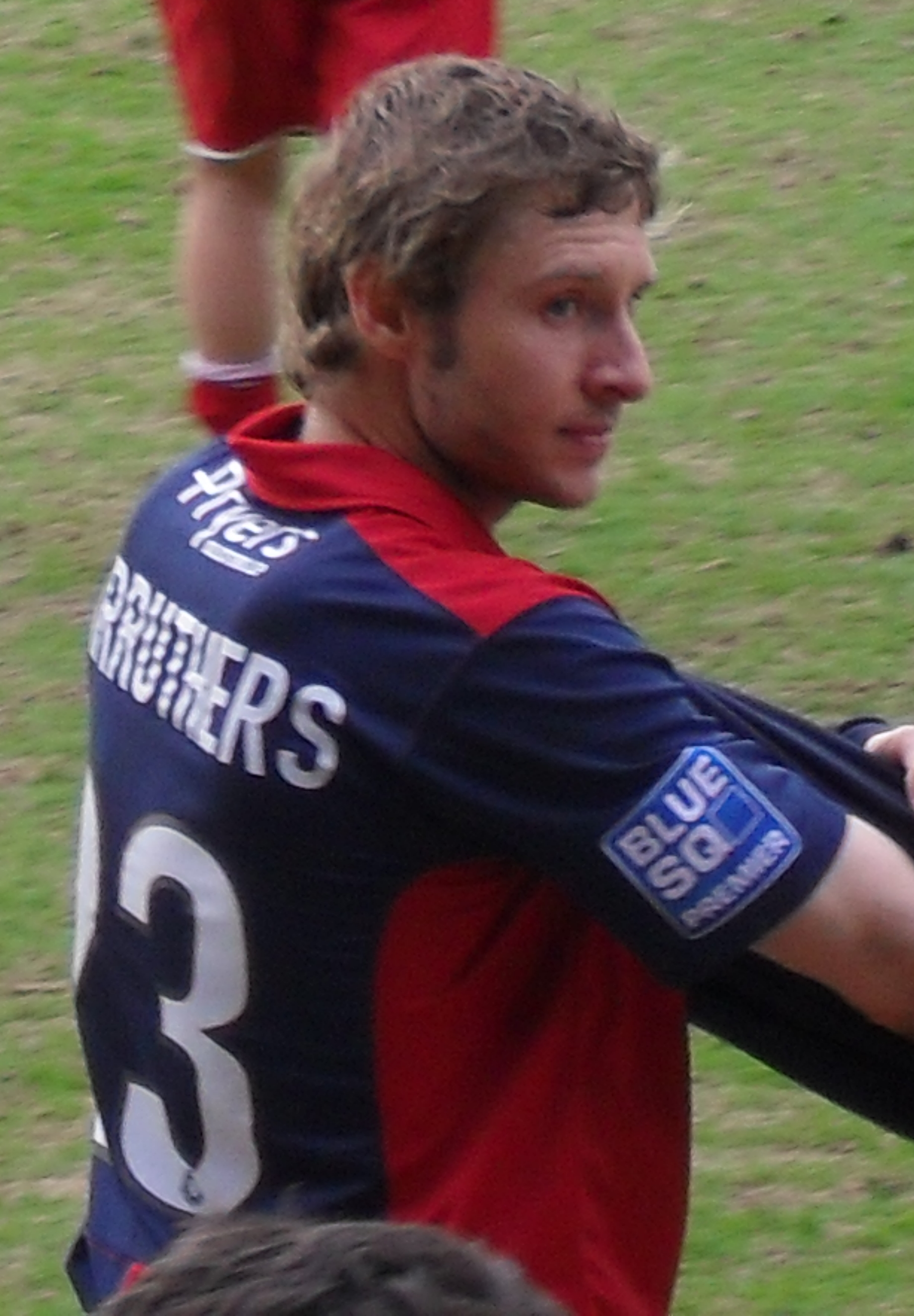
Chris Carruthers signed on loan from Oxford United.

Goals in the opening 10 minutes from Brodie and Gash gave York a 2–0 home win over Crawley Town. A 0–0 draw away to Barrow followed, who had been beaten 6–1 by Rushden & Diamonds in their previous match. Two goals from Brodie, both of which were assisted by Sangaré, gave York 2–0 victory at home to Kettering Town. Simon Russell was loaned out to divisional rivals Tamworth, having failed to play any matches for York up to that point in 2009–10. Gash scored a header on 89 minutes to secure a 2–2 home draw with Cambridge United, after having given York the lead in the first half, before Cambridge scored two goals through Jai Reason and Mark Beesley. Goals from Brodie (2) and Gash gave York a 3–2 victory over Kidderminster. Chris Carruthers was signed from Oxford on a one-month loan to provide competition with Ferrell and Meredith on the left-hand side, while O'Hare was loaned out to Conference North club Gainsborough Trinity.

=== October ===
Sangaré scored a goal in stoppage time to earn York a 1–1 home draw against Stevenage, who had taken the lead through a Parslow own goal. York beat Tamworth 3–2 away, which was the opposition's first home defeat in 2009–10, with goals from Ferrell, Brodie and Sangaré. The team's 10-match unbeaten run came to an end following a 1–0 away defeat by Salisbury, who scored with a penalty in the second-minute. Boyes rejoined the club on loan from Scunthorpe as cover for the injured Gash ahead of a 1–1 home draw with Oxford, who equalised after York had taken the lead through Rankine. Barrett gave them the lead away to Luton Town, before the home team equalised through Asa Hall, the match finishing a 1–1 draw. York played Bedworth United in the FA Cup fourth qualifying round, and a 2–0 home win was secured with goals from Rankine and Brodie. They were beaten 3–1 away by Crawley, after Brodie had given York the lead in the first half.

=== November ===
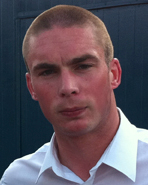
Richard Brodie won the Conference Premier Player of the Month award for November 2009.

Carruthers' loan was extended until January 2010, and after Sangaré picked up an injury, Mansfield defender Luke Graham joined on a one-month loan. York beat League Two team Crewe Alexandra 3–2 in the FA Cup first round, with goals from Brodie and Pacquette. Nelthorpe was loaned to fellow Conference Premier club Barrow until January 2010, having struggled to establish himself in the team. Kevin Gall, a striker released by Darlington, was signed ahead of the match against Chester City, which York won 3–2 after Brodie scored a hat-trick. Former Grays Athletic winger Tyrone Berry was signed on non-contract terms, having impressed on trial. Rankine scored the only goal in a 1–0 home win over Ebbsfleet. He followed this up with the winning goal after scoring a header in a 1–0 away victory over AFC Wimbledon. Lawless scored the only goal in a 1–0 victory at home to Gateshead, with a low shot from Gash's headed assist. Cambridge were beaten 2–1 away in the second round of the FA Cup; Rankine and Brodie scored in the first half, which meant York reached the third round for the first time since 2001–02. Foyle and Brodie respectively were named as the Conference Premier Manager and Player of the Month for November 2009.

=== December ===
Brodie scored the only goal in a 1–0 away victory over Rushden. Mansfield agreed to extend Graham's loan until January 2010, when he would sign for the club permanently. Goals from Carruthers and Brodie gave York a 2–1 home win over Wrexham, a result that equalled the club record for successive victories in all competitions with eight. Youth-team defender Dean Lisles was promoted to the first-team squad, to provide cover for the injured Sangaré, O'Hare and Purkiss. York drew 0–0 away to Hinckley United in the first round of the FA Trophy, and the replay at home was won 3–1, in which Brodie scored his second hat-trick of 2009–10. York beat fellow play-off contenders Mansfield 3–0 on Boxing Day, Brodie (2) and Gash scoring. Berry was released after failing to make an appearance, while Emmerson was loaned out to Ossett Town of the Northern Premier League Premier Division.

=== January ===
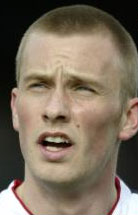
Neil Barrett scored for York in their 3–1 defeat by Stoke City in the FA Cup.

York were defeated 3–1 away by Premier League team Stoke City in the FA Cup third round, after they had taken the lead when Barrett scored a header from a Lawless free kick. Carruthers and Graham signed for the club permanently, with the former signing for 18 months and the latter until the end of the season. York beat Hayes & Yeading 4–1 at home, with Carruthers, Brodie (2) and Gall scoring. A 0–0 away draw with Newport County of the Conference South meant York would have a replay in the FA Trophy second round. Midfielder Courtney Pitt joined on loan from Cambridge for the rest of the season and Russell moved the other way, while Nelthorpe was loaned out to Luton and Gall extended his contract to the end of the season. Barrett scored the only goal with a shot from outside the penalty area to give York a 1–0 win away to Cambridge. York won their FA Trophy second round replay against Newport 1–0 at home, Pacquette scoring the winning goal in stoppage time. O'Hare returned to Gainsborough on loan for the rest of the season. York beat Conference North team Corby Town 1–0 at home in the FA Trophy third round, the winning goal coming from a penalty scored by Ferrell.

=== February ===
Emmerson was released by the club after failing to make any first-team appearances, while Ferrell joined Gateshead for a £3,500 fee and Jamie Clarke signed having been released by Grimsby Town. Purkiss gave York the lead away to Histon before Bradley Hudson-Odoi scored to equalise as the match finished a 1–1 draw, which ended a club record run of league victories at nine. A 1–0 away win over Kettering came after Rankine scored the only goal with a volley from inside the penalty area. Goalkeeper Simon Miotto joined the club as goalkeeping coach, and later registered as a player. York suffered their first league defeat since October 2009 after being beaten 1–0 away to Ebbsfleet; Brodie was sent off in this match, for which he received a three-match suspension. This was followed by a 0–0 draw at home to fellow play-off contenders Luton. York suffered their first home defeat in 10 months after being beaten 1–0 by Eastbourne Borough.

=== March ===
A 2–1 away defeat to Barrow saw the team knocked out of the FA Trophy in the quarter-final, Pacquette scoring for York. York suffered a second straight league defeat after being beaten 2–1 away by Forest Green Rovers, in which Mackin scored after his shot hit the back of an opposition player. Chester's expulsion from the Football Conference resulted in York having the three points gained against them from a 3–2 victory expunged, meaning the team moved down to sixth in the table. York were defeated 2–1 at home by Salisbury, after Sangaré had put the team in the lead. Chesterfield midfielder Paul Harsley joined on loan until the end of the season, and made his debut in a 0–0 draw away to Altrincham, a result that ended a run of three consecutive defeats. York's first victory in six league matches was a 1–0 away win over Mansfield, Pitt scoring his first goal for the club. McWilliams was loaned out to Northern Premier League Premier Division club Whitby Town for one month. A second successive victory came after Barrett scored the only goal in a 1–0 away victory over Kidderminster. Graham opened the scoring in a 1–1 home draw with Tamworth, who equalised through former York player Chris Smith. A 4–0 victory away to Grays saw Brodie score for the first time since January 2010 with two goals; Harsley and Barrett also scored.

=== April and May ===
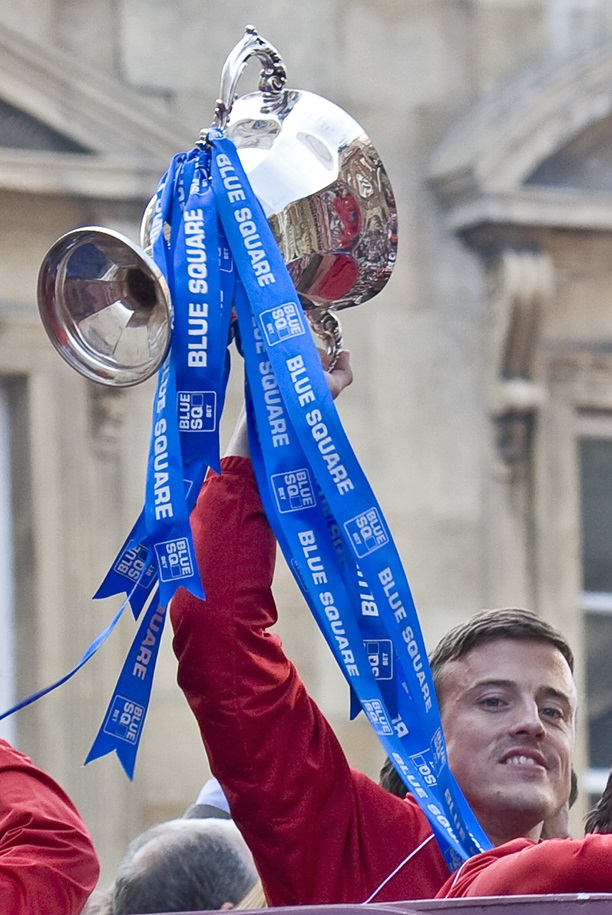
Michael Ingham was voted Clubman of the Year.

York beat Altrincham 2–1 at home after going behind to a Chris Denham goal, before McGurk scored the equaliser and Brodie scored the winning goal with a stoppage time penalty. This was followed by a 5–0 home win over AFC Wimbledon, Rankine scoring goals in each half and Brodie scoring a first half hat-trick. A seven-match unbeaten run came to an end when York were beaten 3–1 away by Eastbourne, conceding three goals in the first 32 minutes before Rankine scored a penalty to finish the scoring. York's place in the play-offs was secured after a 3–0 home win over Barrow, with goals from Brodie (2) and Gash. Before the home match against Grays, Ingham was presented as the 2009–10 Clubman of the Year, voted for by the club's supporters. The match finished a 1–1 draw, Brodie giving York the lead before Duran Reynolds equalised for Grays on 89 minutes.

The team completed their league programme with a 1–0 defeat away to champions Stevenage. York finished in fifth place in the Conference Premier table, which meant they would play Luton in the play-off semi-final. Brodie scored on 90 minutes to give York a 1–0 home win first leg. York won the second leg 1–0 away with a Carruthers goal, meaning the tie ended 2–0 on aggregate. Following the match, the squad were forced to leave Kenilworth Road through the back of a stand after having missiles thrown at them by a section of Luton fans. The team lost the play-off final 3–1 to Oxford at Wembley, in which York scored from an own goal conceded by goalkeeper Ryan Clarke.

== Summary and aftermath ==
York spent most of the season in a play-off place, and rose as high as second in February 2010, while they were as low as 17th in August 2009. Their defensive record of 35 goals conceded was the third-best in the division, while their record of two home league defeats was the joint second-best. Meredith made the highest number of appearances during the season, appearing in 56 of York's 57 matches. Brodie was York's top scorer in the league and in all competitions, with 26 league goals and 34 in total. Rankine was the only other player to reach double figures, with 10 goals.

York released Clarke, Gall, Mimms, Nelthorpe, O'Hare and Pacquette at the end of the season, while Graham, Purkiss, Russell and Smith left for Kettering, Oxford, Cambridge and Mansfield respectively. Mackin and Sangaré signed new contracts. York's summer signings were goalkeeper David Knight on a season-long loan from Histon, defenders Duane Courtney from Kidderminster and Greg Young from Altrincham, midfielder Jonathan Smith from Forest Green, wingers David McDermott from Kidderminster and Peter Till from and Walsall, and striker George Purcell from Braintree Town. York handed professional contracts to two youth-team players, winger Jamie Hopcutt and Lisles.

== Match details ==
=== Conference Premier ===
Conference Premier match details
Date	League position	Opponents	Venue	Result	Score F–A	Scorers	Attendance	Ref.
8 August 2009	16th	Oxford United	A	L	1–2	Brodie 33'	6,403	
11 August 2009	17th	Rushden & Diamonds	H	D	0–0		2,267	
15 August 2009	8th	Forest Green Rovers	H	W	2–0	Rankine 74' pen., Smith 90'	1,954	
18 August 2009	14th	Wrexham	A	L	0–1		3,371	
22 August 2009	16th	Hayes & Yeading United	A	D	1–1	Pacquette 84'	606	
25 August 2009	10th	Gateshead	A	W	2–1	Brodie 54', Gash 80'	1,174	
29 August 2009	4th	Histon	H	W	3–1	Brodie (2) 12', 65' pen., Smith 58'	1,944	
5 September 2009	6th	Crawley Town	H	W	2–0	Brodie 6' pen., Gash 10'	2,139	
8 September 2009	5th	Barrow	A	D	0–0		1,120	
12 September 2009	3rd	Kettering Town	H	W	2–0	Brodie (2) 57', 69'	2,275	
22 September 2009	5th	Cambridge United	H	D	2–2	Gash (2) 33', 89'	2,321	
26 September 2009	3rd	Kidderminster Harriers	H	W	3–2	Brodie (2) 10' pen., 32', Gash 58'	2,509	
3 October 2009	7th	Stevenage Borough	H	D	1–1	Sangaré 90'	2,644	
6 October 2009	3rd	Tamworth	A	W	3–2	Ferrell 40', Brodie 61', Sangaré 78'	1,118	
10 October 2009	6th	Salisbury City	A	L	0–1		1,266	
17 October 2009	6th	Oxford United	H	D	1–1	Rankine 71'	4,302	
20 October 2009	6th	Luton Town	A	D	1–1	Barrett 36'	6,387	
31 October 2009	6th	Crawley Town	A	L	1–3	Brodie 28'	975	
10 November 2009	—	Chester City	H	W	3–2 (Note: Chester City's results were expunged after they were expelled from the Football Conference, meaning York's 3–2 victory over them was removed from the records.)	Brodie (3) 1', 32' pen., 47'	2,164	
14 November 2009	6th	Ebbsfleet United	H	W	1–0	Rankine 38'	2,629	
21 November 2009	6th	AFC Wimbledon	A	W	1–0	Rankine 64'	4,016	
24 November 2009	4th	Gateshead	H	W	1–0	Lawless 25'	2,302	
1 December 2009	3rd	Rushden & Diamonds	A	W	1–0	Brodie 73'	1,117	
5 December 2009	3rd	Wrexham	H	W	2–1	Carruthers 6', Brodie 81'	3,006	
26 December 2009	3rd	Mansfield Town	H	W	3–0	Brodie (2) 21', 48' pen., Gash 81'	4,587	
16 January 2010	3rd	Hayes & Yeading United	H	W	4–1	Carruthers 25', Brodie (2) 47', 58', Gall 83'	2,403	
23 January 2010	3rd	Cambridge United	A	W	1–0	Barrett 48'	2,646	
2 February 2010	3rd	Histon	A	D	1–1	Purkiss 20'	487	
6 February 2010	2nd	Kettering Town	A	W	1–0	Rankine 16'	1,375	
13 February 2010	3rd	Ebbsfleet United	A	L	0–1		1,226	
16 February 2010	3rd	Luton Town	H	D	0–0		3,316	
27 February 2010	3rd	Eastbourne Borough	H	L	0–1		2,611	
6 March 2010	6th	Forest Green Rovers	A	L	1–2	Mackin 34'	892	
9 March 2010	6th	Salisbury City	H	L	1–2	Sangaré 42'	1,867	
13 March 2010	6th	Altrincham	A	D	0–0		1,236	
16 March 2010	5th	Mansfield Town	A	W	1–0	Pitt 61'	2,638	
23 March 2010	4th	Kidderminster Harriers	A	W	1–0	Barrett 67'	1,127	
27 March 2010	5th	Tamworth	H	D	1–1	Graham 57'	2,863	
30 March 2010	5th	Grays Athletic	A	W	4–0	Harsley 31', Brodie (2) 37', 42', Barrett 57'	323	
5 April 2010	5th	Altrincham	H	W	2–1	McGurk 69', Brodie 90+3' pen.	3,005	
7 April 2010	4th	AFC Wimbledon	H	W	5–0	Rankine (2) 1', 70', Brodie (3) 17' pen., 22', 36' pen.	2,667	
10 April 2010	5th	Eastbourne Borough	A	L	1–3	Rankine 45' pen.	1,144	
13 April 2010	4th	Barrow	H	W	3–0	Brodie (2) 40', 83', Gash 90'	2,154	
17 April 2010	5th	Grays Athletic	H	D	1–1	Brodie 51'	2,854	
24 April 2010	5th	Stevenage Borough	A	L	0–1		5,068	

=== League table (part) ===
Final Conference Premier table (part)
Pos	Club	Pld	W	D	L	F	A	GD	Pts
3rd	Oxford United	44	25	11	8	64	31	+33	86
4th	Rushden & Diamonds	44	22	13	9	77	39	+38	79
5th	York City	44	22	12	10	62	35	+27	78
6th	Kettering Town	44	18	12	14	51	41	+10	66
7th	Crawley Town	44	19	9	16	50	57	−7	66
Key	Pos = League position; Pld = Matches played; W = Matches won; D = Matches drawn; L = Matches lost; F = Goals for; A = Goals against; GD = Goal difference; Pts = Points								
Source									

=== FA Cup ===
FA Cup match details
Round	Date	Opponents	Venue	Result	Score F–A	Scorers	Attendance	Ref.
Fourth qualifying round	24 October 2009	Bedworth United	H	W	2–0	Rankine 7', Brodie 42'	1,869	
First round	7 November 2009	Crewe Alexandra	H	W	3–2	Brodie (2) 39', 88', Pacquette 86'	3,070	
Second round	28 November 2009	Cambridge United	A	W	2–1	Rankine 37', Brodie pen. 40'	3,505	
Third round	2 January 2010	Stoke City	A	L	1–3	Barrett 22'	15,586	

=== FA Trophy ===
FA Trophy match details
Round	Date	Opponents	Venue	Result	Score F–A	Scorers	Attendance	Ref.
First round	12 December 2009	Hinckley United	A	D	0–0		506	
First round replay	15 December 2009	Hinckley United	H	W	3–1	Brodie (3) 36', 59', 90'	853	
Second round	20 January 2010	Newport County	A	D	0–0		1,040	
Second round replay	26 January 2010	Newport County	H	W	1–0	Pacquette 90'	1,378	
Third round	30 January 2010	Corby Town	H	W	1–0	Ferrell 40' pen.	2,205	
Fourth round	2 March 2010	Barrow	A	L	1–2	Pacquette 70'	1,525	

=== Conference Premier play-offs ===
Conference Premier play-offs match details
Round	Date	Opponents	Venue	Result	Score F–A	Scorers	Attendance	Ref.
Semi-final first leg	29 April 2010	Luton Town	H	W	1–0	Brodie 90'	6,204	
Semi-final second leg	3 May 2010	Luton Town	A	W	1–0; 2–0 agg.	Carruthers 47'	9,781	
Final	16 May 2010	Oxford United	N	L	1–3	Clarke 42' o.g.	42,669	

== Transfers ==
=== In ===
Date	Player	Club†	Fee	Ref.
20 May 2009	Andy Ferrell	(Kidderminster Harriers)	Free	
20 May 2009	Craig Nelthorpe	(Oxford United)	Free	
22 May 2009	Levi Mackin	(Wrexham)	Free	
22 May 2009	James Meredith	(Shrewsbury Town)	Free	
22 May 2009	Richard Pacquette	(Maidenhead United)	Free	
12 June 2009	Michael Rankine	Rushden & Diamonds	£10,000/swap (Note: Swap deal with Craig Farrell)	
17 June 2009	Alex Lawless	(Forest Green Rovers)	Free	
29 June 2009	Neil Barrett	(Ebbsfleet United)	Free	
30 June 2009	Alan O'Hare	(Mansfield Town)	Free	
24 July 2009	Michael Gash	Ebbsfleet United	£55,000	
25 July 2009	Djoumin Sangaré	(Salisbury City)	Free	
10 November 2009	Kevin Gall	(Darlington)	Free	
13 November 2009	Tyrone Berry	(Grays Athletic)	Free	
6 January 2010	Chris Carruthers	(Oxford United)	Free	
6 January 2010	Luke Graham	Mansfield Town	Free	
1 February 2010	Jamie Clarke	(Grimsby Town)	Free	
19 February 2010	Simon Miotto	(Herfølge Boldklub)	Free	

† Brackets around club names denote the player's contract with that club had expired before he joined York.

=== Out ===
Date	Player	Club†	Fee	Ref.
2 July 2009	Ben Wilkinson	(Chester City)	Released	
10 July 2009	Adam Boyes	Scunthorpe United	Undisclosed	
28 December 2009	Tyrone Berry	(Forest Green Rovers)	Released	
1 February 2010	Michael Emmerson	(Norton & Stockton Ancients)	Released	
1 February 2010	Andy Ferrell	Gateshead	£3,500	
10 May 2010	Simon Russell	(Cambridge United)	Free	
18 May 2010	Jamie Clarke	(Gainsborough Trinity)	Released	
18 May 2010	Kevin Gall	(Wrexham)	Released	
18 May 2010	Josh Mimms	(Retford United)	Released	
18 May 2010	Craig Nelthorpe	(Gateshead)	Released	
18 May 2010	Alan O'Hare	(Glapwell)	Released	
18 May 2010	Richard Pacquette	(Eastbourne Borough)	Released	
19 May 2010	Adam Smith	(Mansfield Town)	Free	
21 May 2010	Ben Purkiss	(Oxford United)	Free	
4 June 2010	Luke Graham	(Kettering Town)	Free	

† Brackets around club names denote the player joined that club after his York contract expired.

=== Loans in ===
Date	Player	Club	Return	Ref.
28 September 2009	Chris Carruthers	Oxford United	2 January 2010	
16 October 2009	Adam Boyes	Scunthorpe United	17 November 2009	
5 November 2009	Luke Graham	Mansfield Town	Made permanent 6 January 2010	
22 January 2010	Courtney Pitt	Cambridge United	End of season	
13 March 2010	Paul Harsley	Chesterfield	End of season	

=== Loans out ===
Date	Player	Club	Return	Ref.
17 August 2009	Michael Emmerson	Billingham Town	One-month	
17 September 2009	Simon Russell	Tamworth	19 December 2009	
1 October 2009	Alan O'Hare	Gainsborough Trinity	3 January 2010	
10 November 2009	Craig Nelthorpe	Barrow	1 January 2010	
28 December 2009	Michael Emmerson	Ossett Town	One-month	
22 January 2010	Craig Nelthorpe	Luton Town	End of season	
22 January 2010	Simon Russell	Cambridge United	End of season	
28 January 2010	Alan O'Hare	Gainsborough Trinity	End of season	
19 March 2010	Andy McWilliams	Whitby Town	One-month	

== Appearances and goals ==
Numbers in parentheses denote appearances as substitute.
Players with names struck through and marked † left the club during the playing season.
Players with names in italics and marked * were on loan from another club for the whole of their season with York.
Players listed with no appearances have been in the matchday squad but only as unused substitutes.
Key to positions: GK – Goalkeeper; DF – Defender; MF – Midfielder; FW – Forward

Players included in matchday squads
No.	Pos.	Nat.	Name	League		FA Cup		FA Trophy		Play-offs		Total		Discipline	
No.	Pos.	Nat.	Name	Apps	Goals	Apps	Goals	Apps	Goals	Apps	Goals	Apps	Goals	A yellow rectangle, denoting the yellow penalty card shown to a player being cautioned	A red rectangle, denoting the red penalty card shown to a player being sent off
2	DF	ENG	Ben Purkiss	34 (2)	1	2 (1)	0	3 (2)	0	3	0	42 (5)	1	1	0
3	DF	AUS	James Meredith	42 (1)	0	4	0	6	0	3	0	55 (1)	0	8	1
4	DF	IRL	Alan O'Hare	0	0	0	0	0	0	0	0	0	0	0	0
5	DF	ENG	David McGurk	28 (6)	1	4	0	5	0	3	0	40 (6)	1	6	0
6	DF	WAL	Daniel Parslow	33	0	3	0	4	0	0 (1)	0	40 (1)	0	1	0
7	MF	ENG	Adam Smith	13 (14)	2	1 (1)	0	4	0	0 (1)	0	18 (16)	2	4	0
8	MF	ENG	~~Andy Ferrell~~ †	16 (6)	1	0 (3)	0	4	1	0	0	20 (9)	2	8	0
9	FW	ENG	Michael Gash	21 (15)	7	0 (1)	0	3 (3)	0	0 (3)	0	24 (22)	7	2	0
10	FW	DMA	Richard Pacquette	3 (10)	1	0 (1)	1	2 (2)	2	0	0	5 (13)	4	0	1
11	MF	ENG	Craig Nelthorpe	0 (7)	0	0 (1)	0	0	0	0	0	0 (8)	0	1	0
12	MF	WAL	Alex Lawless	31 (4)	1	4	0	3	0	3	0	41 (4)	1	6	0
13	GK	ENG	Josh Mimms	1	0	0	0	1	0	0	0	2	0	0	0
14	MF	ENG	Neil Barrett	39 (2)	4	4	1	2 (1)	0	3	0	48 (3)	5	5	0
15	FW	ENG	Michael Rankine	29 (14)	8	4	2	4 (1)	0	3	0	40 (15)	10	4	0
16	FW	ENG	Richard Brodie	36 (4)	26	4	4	2 (2)	3	3	1	45 (6)	34	12	1
17	MF	WAL	Levi Mackin	29 (5)	1	2 (1)	0	5	0	3	0	39 (6)	1	11	0
20	DF	ENG	Andy McWilliams	0 (3)	0	0	0	0	0	0	0	0 (3)	0	0	0
21	DF	FRA	Djoumin Sangaré	18 (4)	3	1	0	1 (2)	0	0 (2)	0	20 (8)	3	3	0
23	DF	ENG	Chris Carruthers	22 (4)	2	4	0	4 (2)	0	3	1	33 (6)	3	3	0
24	GK	NIR	Michael Ingham	43	0	4	0	5	0	3	0	55	0	3	0
25	FW	ENG	~~Adam Boyes~~ * †	1 (2)	0	1	0	0	0	0	0	2 (2)	0	0	0
25	MF	ENG	Jamie Clarke	7	0	0	0	1	0	0	0	8	0	0	0
26	DF	WAL	Luke Graham	25	1	2 (1)	0	5	0	3	0	35 (1)	1	2	0
27	FW	WAL	Kevin Gall	0 (5)	1	0 (1)	0	2 (1)	0	0	0	2 (7)	1	0	0
28	MF	ENG	~~Tyrone Berry~~ †	0	0	0	0	0	0	0	0	0	0	0	0
28	MF	ENG	Courtney Pitt *	6 (5)	1	0	0	0	0	0 (1)	0	6 (6)	1	1	0
29	MF	ENG	Paul Harsley *	7 (2)	1	0	0	0	0	0	0	7 (2)	1	0	0

Players not included in matchday squads
No.	Pos.	Nat.	Name
18	FW	ENG	~~Michael Emmerson~~ †
19	MF	ENG	~~Simon Russell~~ †
22	DF	ENG	Dean Lisles
33	GK	AUS	Simon Miotto

== See also ==
- List of York City F.C. seasons
