= Tyrone =

Tyrone may refer to:

- Kingdom of Tyrone or Tír Eoghain, a kingdom of Gaelic Ireland
- County Tyrone, a county in Northern Ireland
- Earl of Tyrone, a title in the Peerage of Ireland
- Tyrone (name), a male given name

== Places ==
=== Canada ===
- Tyrone, Ontario

=== Ireland ===
- County Tyrone (Parliament of Ireland constituency)
- County Tyrone (UK Parliament constituency)

=== United States ===
- Tyrone, Colorado
- Tyrone, Georgia
- Tyrone, Iowa
- Tyrone, Kentucky
- Tyrone, Missouri
- Tyrone, New Mexico
- Tyrone (ghost town), New Mexico
- Tyrone, New York
- Tyrone, Coshocton County, Ohio
- Tyrone, Morrow County, Ohio
- Tyrone, Oklahoma
- Tyrone, Pennsylvania
  - Tyrone (Amtrak station)
- Tyrone, West Virginia
- Tyrone, Wisconsin
- Tyrone Township, Michigan (disambiguation)
- Tyrone Township, Pennsylvania (disambiguation)

== Other uses ==
- Tyrone GAA, a county board of the Gaelic Athletic Association
  - Tyrone county football team
- "Tyrone" (song), a song by Erykah Badu

== See also ==
- Tyone, a townland in County Tipperary, Ireland
