= Tyrone Township, Michigan =

Tyrone Township is the name of some places in the U.S. state of Michigan:

- Tyrone Township, Kent County, Michigan
- Tyrone Township, Livingston County, Michigan

== See also ==
- Tyrone Township (disambiguation)
