= Adam Smith (footballer, born February 1985) =

English football (born 1985)

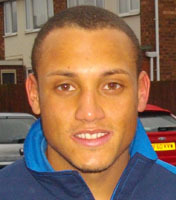
- Smith in 2011

Personal information
- Full name: Nathan Adam Smith
- Date of birth: 20 February 1985 (age 41)
- Place of birth: Huddersfield, England
- Height: 5 ft 11 in (1.80 m)
- Position: Right winger

Youth career
- –2001: Chesterfield

Senior career*
Years	Team	Apps	(Gls)
2001–2008	Chesterfield	66	(3)
2008	→ Lincoln City (loan)	4	(0)
2008–2009	Gainsborough Trinity	13	(2)
2008–2009	→ York City (loan)	7	(2)
2009–2010	York City	37	(2)
2010–2012	Mansfield Town	43	(8)
2011	→ Aldershot Town (loan)	6	(0)
2011–2012	→ Aldershot Town (loan)	6	(0)
2012–2013	Lincoln City	30	(1)
2013–2015	FC Halifax Town	80	(4)
2015–2016	Wrexham	12	(1)
2015–2016	→ Guiseley (loan)	8	(0)
2016	Guiseley	10	(1)
2016–2018	Alfreton Town	15	(4)
2018	Gainsborough Trinity	1	(0)
2018	Bradford Park Avenue	7	(0)
2018	Matlock Town	6	(0)
2019–2020	Grantham Town	13	(0)
Total		364	(28)
- * Club domestic league appearances and goals

Nathan Adam Smith (born 20 February 1985), known as Adam Smith, is an English semi-professional footballer who plays as a right winger. He has played in the Football League for Chesterfield, Lincoln City and Aldershot Town.

Smith came through the youth ranks at Chesterfield, who had originally spotted him playing local football. He broke into the first-team squad in 2001 and made his debut a year later. He was forced to undergo knee surgery in 2005 and has suffered several injuries during his career. He was loaned out to Lincoln City in 2008 and was released by Chesterfield after seven seasons at the club, after which he moved down to play in non-League football with Gainsborough Trinity, York City, Mansfield Town, Lincoln City, FC Halifax Town, Wrexham, Guiseley, Alfreton Town and Bradford Park Avenue.

== Career ==
=== Chesterfield ===
Smith played in the Huddersfield and District Association Football League for Lepton Highlanders. He trialled at Football League clubs Huddersfield Town and Oldham Athletic at the ages of 14 at 15 respectively. While playing for Kirkheaton he was spotted by Chesterfield and was invited for a trial match, and was eventually offered a place on the club' scholarship scheme. He began training with the first team during the 2001–02 season and was first named on the bench for Chesterfield's 1–0 victory over Reading at the Madejski Stadium on 1 December 2001. He made his debut in a Football League Trophy match against Port Vale on 22 November 2002, where he came on as a substitute in the 77th minute, and scored in the penalty shoot-out that was eventually lost 4–3. His Football League debut came on 13 September 2003 after coming on as a substitute for the injured Mark DeBolla in the 79th minute of a 1–0 defeat to Notts County. He went on to make further appearances that month against Brighton & Hove Albion and Brentford, where he played on the left wing. He was offered a two-year professional contract with Chesterfield in March 2004, effective from the 2004–05 season. His first league start for Chesterfield came in a 1–0 defeat to Hull City on 10 October. He underwent laparoscopic surgery on his knee to repair cartilage damage in February 2005, which was expected to rule him out for six weeks. He made his return on 18 March after coming on as a 60th-minute substitute for Carlos Logan in a 2–2 draw with Brentford. Soon after making his return, he picked up an injury to his left ankle, which was sustained during Chesterfield's 3–2 defeat to AFC Bournemouth. This ruled him out for the rest of the season, which he finished with 19 appearances.

He was fit for the start of 2005–06 and set up two of Chesterfield's goals in the 3–1 opening day victory over Blackpool. He went on to score his first goals for Chesterfield with a brace after coming on as a half-time substitute against Yeovil Town; he scored from a pass from Paul Hall after Yeovil goalkeeper Chris Weale was left stranded after being lobbed, and then scored his second after gaining the ball from Mark Allott, which helped his team to a 3–1 victory. An 89th-minute goal from Smith against Bradford City on 7 January 2006 saw his team earn a 1–0 victory. He agreed to a new two-year contract at Chesterfield in March and finished 2005–06 with 29 appearances and scoring three goals. His recurring knee injury was confirmed to be severe patella tendinitis, which resulted in him being unfit for the start of 2006–07. He made his return to action in a friendly against Staveley Miners Welfare in August and made his first league appearance of the season in a 4–0 defeat to Nottingham Forest on 2 September 2006 after coming on as a 63rd-minute substitute. He scored the winner for Chesterfield in the Football League Trophy against Oldham Athletic with a diagonal shot from distance. Smith suffered from a knee injury in March 2007, which resulted in him undergoing surgery that ruled him out for the remainder of the 2006–07 season; in which he made 17 appearances and scored one goal, while Chesterfield were relegated to League Two. His severe tendinitis affected him in September, and eventually made his return in a 2–1 defeat to Tranmere Rovers in the FA Cup first round on 10 November. He was sent out on loan at League Two club Lincoln City for a month on 4 January 2008 and made his debut for the team a day later, helping set up the first goal in a 2–0 victory over Rochdale, after Jamie Forrester scored from goalkeeper Sam Russell's parry of a Smith effort. He made four appearances during his stay at Lincoln, all as a substitute, which was concluded after Lincoln decided against extending his loan at the club.

=== Gainsborough Trinity and York City ===
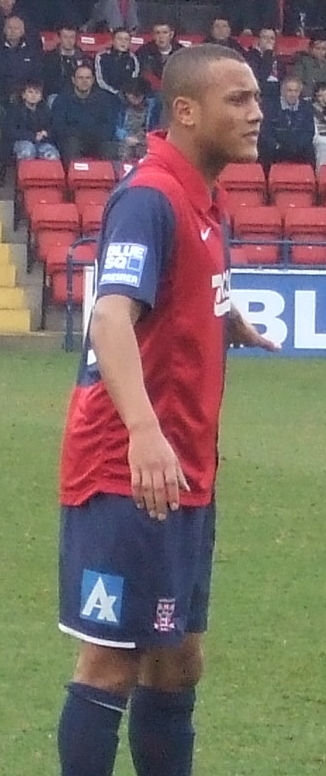
Smith playing for York City in 2009

Smith was released by Chesterfield after he was not offered a new contract at the end of 2007–08. He trialled with Darlington of League Two, but was told by manager Dave Penney he was not what they were looking for. He then had a trial with newly relegated Conference Premier club Wrexham and eventually signed a contract with Gainsborough Trinity of the Conference North in late August. Smith made a goalscoring debut for Gainsborough with the team's goal in a 1–1 draw at home to Vauxhall Motors on 30 August. He joined York City in the Conference Premier on loan on 27 November, becoming Martin Foyle's first signing as manager, in a deal that would expire on 6 January 2009. Smith made his debut after coming on as a 63rd-minute substitute for Craig Farrell in a 1–1 draw with Salisbury City. His first goal came after scoring the opener for York with a close range finish in a 3–1 victory over Ebbsfleet United. Following this, Foyle stated his intention of extending Smith's loan at York. Smith said he was looking to join the club on a permanent contract and that Gainsborough manager Steve Charles would allow him to leave for a club in a higher division on a free transfer. However, a move to York stalled in January as Gainsborough were holding out for a fee, although Foyle refused to pay this. York eventually made an offer of a quarter of Gainsborough's asking price, which was rejected.

He signed for York permanently on 26 January for an undisclosed fee on a contract until the end of 2009–10 season. His first appearance after returning came as a 74th-minute substitute in a 1–1 draw against Altrincham on 27 January. A bruised foot picked up in a reserve-team match meant he was unable to play for York against Grays Athletic in April. He was forced into missing some matches towards the end of 2008–09 due to concerns over his baby daughter, which he finished with 17 appearances and two goals for York. Smith made his first appearance of 2009–10 after being introduced as an 86th-minute substitute against Rushden & Diamonds on 11 August, the second match of the season, which finished as a 0–0 draw. In the following match, he came on in the 87th minute and played as a striker, scoring York's second goal in a 2–0 victory over Forest Green Rovers. Soon after this match, he suffered from sciatica during a training session. He featured as a substitute in York's play-off semi-final first leg victory over Luton Town, which finished 1–0, with the tie ending 2–0 on aggregate. After finishing the season with 34 appearances and two goals for York he entered negotiations with the club over a new contract.

=== Mansfield Town and Lincoln City ===
He eventually turned down talks with York and agreed to sign a one-year contract with fellow Conference team Mansfield Town on 19 May. On signing, Smith said "It was time for a change after not getting as much football as I would have liked. I'm still young, Mansfield are going in the right direction and I'm excited about the new season". He made his debut in the opening match of 2010–11, a 3–1 victory over Forest Green, and was substituted in the 80th minute. Smith scored his first goal for Mansfield in a 4–0 victory over Altrincham on 30 August. A red card in the 61st minute of a 1–0 defeat away to Gateshead on 2 October for a high challenge resulted in a three match suspension. He finished the season with 38 appearances and six goals.

Having been restricted to three appearances as a substitute for Mansfield in 2011–12, Smith joined League Two club Aldershot Town on a one-month loan on 7 October 2011. He returned to Mansfield on 10 November to receive treatment for a slight back strain, before re-signing for Aldershot on loan until 7 January 2012 on 23 November.

Smith signed for Conference rivals Lincoln City on a one-year contract on 21 June 2012. He made his debut after starting Lincoln's 1–0 victory over Kidderminster Harriers on 11 August 2012, which was the team's opening match of 2012–13. He finished the season with 37 appearances and two goals.

=== Later career ===
Smith joined newly promoted Conference club FC Halifax Town on 2 July 2013, making his debut in their 5–1 defeat away to Cambridge United in the opening match of 2013–14 on 11 August. He signed for Halifax's National League rivals Wrexham on 18 June 2015. On 5 November 2015, he joined their divisional rivals Guiseley on loan until January 2016. Smith made a positive impact in eight appearances while on loan, which led to Guiseley signing him permanently on 5 January 2016.

Smith's time at Guiseley was short-lived and he signed with Alfreton Town on 5 October 2016. Making his debut in a National League North match away to F.C. United of Manchester, Smith scored two goals in a 4–3 defeat. He re-signed for National League North club Gainsborough Trinity on 5 January 2018. He made his only appearance the next day as a half-time substitute in a 4–0 defeat away to Blyth Spartans, before signing for Gainsborough's divisional rivals Bradford Park Avenue on 26 January 2018. He was released at the end of 2017–18. Smith signed for Northern Premier League Premier Division club Matlock Town on 30 July 2018. He left the club on 3 October 2018 after talks with manager Dave Frecklington.

Smith signed for Northern Premier League Premier Division club Grantham Town on 6 February 2019 as a player-coach, working under managers Russ Cousins and Paul Rawden. Smith made his debut six days later when starting in a 2–1 home win of South Shields in the league. He made five appearances as Grantham finished in 18th place in the 2018–19 Northern Premier League Premier Division. He was appointed as player-assistant manager on 27 September 2019 before leaving the club on 27 February 2020 alongside Cousins and Rawden. Smith had made 11 appearances and scored 1 goal in all competitions by the time the 2019–20 season was abandoned and results expunged because of the COVID-19 pandemic in England.

== Style of play ==
Smith is a right winger who has also played on the left, although in this position his crossing ability is reduced. He has been described as a "flying winger", whose play is "raiding" and "foraging". He is also capable of playing as a striker.

== Personal life ==
Smith was born in Huddersfield, West Yorkshire, and grew up as a supporter of hometown club Huddersfield Town and Manchester United. After leaving Chesterfield, he started studying a course in sports massage therapy. In January 2017, he received a suspended prison sentence when found guilty of fraud.

== Career statistics ==
Appearances and goals by club, season and competition
Club	Season	League			FA Cup		League Cup		Other		Total	
Club	Season	Division	Apps	Goals	Apps	Goals	Apps	Goals	Apps	Goals	Apps	Goals
Chesterfield	2001–02	Second Division	0	0	0	0	0	0	0	0	0	0
Chesterfield	2002–03	Second Division	0	0	0	0	0	0	1 (Note: Appearance(s) in Football League Trophy)	0	1	0
Chesterfield	2003–04	Second Division	3	0	0	0	0	0	0	0	3	0
Chesterfield	2004–05	League One	16	0	1	0	1	0	1	0	19	0
Chesterfield	2005–06	League One	26	3	1	0	1	0	1	0	29	3
Chesterfield	2006–07	League One	13	0	1	0	1	0	2	1	17	1
Chesterfield	2007–08	League Two	8	0	1	0	1	0	0	0	10	0
Chesterfield	Total		66	3	4	0	4	0	5	1	79	4
Lincoln City (loan)	2007–08	League Two	4	0	—		—		—		4	0
Gainsborough Trinity	2008–09	Conference North	13	2	1	0	—		2 (Note: One appearance and one goal in Conference League Cup, one appearance in FA Trophy)	1	16	3
York City	2008–09	Conference Premier	17	2	—		—		—		17	2
York City	2009–10	Conference Premier	27	2	2	0	—		5 (Note: Four appearances in FA Trophy, one in Conference Premier play-offs)	0	34	2
York City	Total		44	4	2	0	—		5	0	51	4
Mansfield Town	2010–11	Conference Premier	31	6	2	0	—		5 (Note: Appearance(s) in FA Trophy)	0	38	6
Mansfield Town	2011–12	Conference Premier	12	2	—		—		—		12	2
Mansfield Town	Total		43	8	2	0	—		5	0	50	8
Aldershot Town (loan)	2011–12	League Two	12	0	1	0	1	0	—		14	0
Lincoln City	2012–13	Conference Premier	30	1	6	1	—		1	0	37	2
FC Halifax Town	2013–14	Conference Premier	40	3	1	0	—		3 (Note: One appearance in FA Trophy, two in Conference Premier play-offs)	0	44	3
FC Halifax Town	2014–15	Conference Premier	40	1	3	2	—		3	0	46	3
FC Halifax Town	Total		80	4	4	2	—		6	0	90	6
Wrexham	2015–16	National League	12	1	0	0	—		—		12	1
Guiseley	2015–16	National League	11	0	—		—		1	0	12	0
Guiseley	2016–17	National League	7	1	—		—		—		7	1
Guiseley	Total		18	1	—		—		1	0	19	1
Alfreton Town	2016–17	National League North	7	3	3	0	—		3	0	13	3
Alfreton Town	2017–18	National League North	8	1	2	0	—		0	0	10	1
Alfreton Town	Total		15	4	5	0	—		3	0	23	4
Gainsborough Trinity	2017–18	National League North	1	0	—		—		0	0	1	0
Bradford Park Avenue	2017–18	National League North	7	0	—		—		0	0	7	0
Matlock Town	2018–19	Northern Premier League Premier Division	6	0	1	0	—		—		7	0
Grantham Town	2018–19	Northern Premier League Premier Division	5	0	—		—		—		5	0
Grantham Town	2019–20	Northern Premier League Premier Division	8	0	0	0	—		3 (Note: One appearance one goal in FA Trophy, one appearance in Lincolnshire Senior Cup, one appearance in Northern Premier League Challenge Cup)	1	11	1
Grantham Town	Total		13	0	0	0	—		3	1	16	1
Career total			364	28	26	3	5	0	31	3	426	34
