= Tryon =

Tryon may refer to:

- Tryon (surname)

== Places ==
- Tryon Creek, tributary of the Willamette River in Oregon
- Tryon Street, major north-south street of Charlotte, North Carolina
- Tryon, Prince Edward Island, Canada, unincorporated area
- Settled communities:
  - Tryon, North Carolina, town
  - Tryon, Oklahoma, town
  - Unincorporated communities:
    - Tryon, Nebraska
    - Tryon, Gaston County, North Carolina
- Defunct counties:
  - Tryon County, New York
  - Tryon County, North Carolina

== Other uses ==
- USS Tryon (APH-1), US Navy medical evacuation transport named for James R. Tryon

== See also ==
- Tyron, a given name
