= Tyrone (name) =

- Pronunciation: English: /taɪˈroʊn/
- Gender: Male

Other names
- Related names: Tyron

Tyrone is a male given name of Irish origin. The name originates from the toponym County Tyrone in Northern Ireland, which in turn derives from the Irish language Tír Eoghain ("land of Eoghan"). Tír Eoghain was the name of a Gaelic kingdom of medieval Ireland. Eoghan is variant of Eógan and Owen, or the Scottish Ewan. The name was popularised by American actor Tyrone Power (1914–1958), who descended from a long Irish theatrical line going back to his great-grandfather, the Irish actor and comedian Tyrone Power (1797–1841). In the United States, the name became increasingly popular due to use by African Americans.

== People ==
=== Given name ===
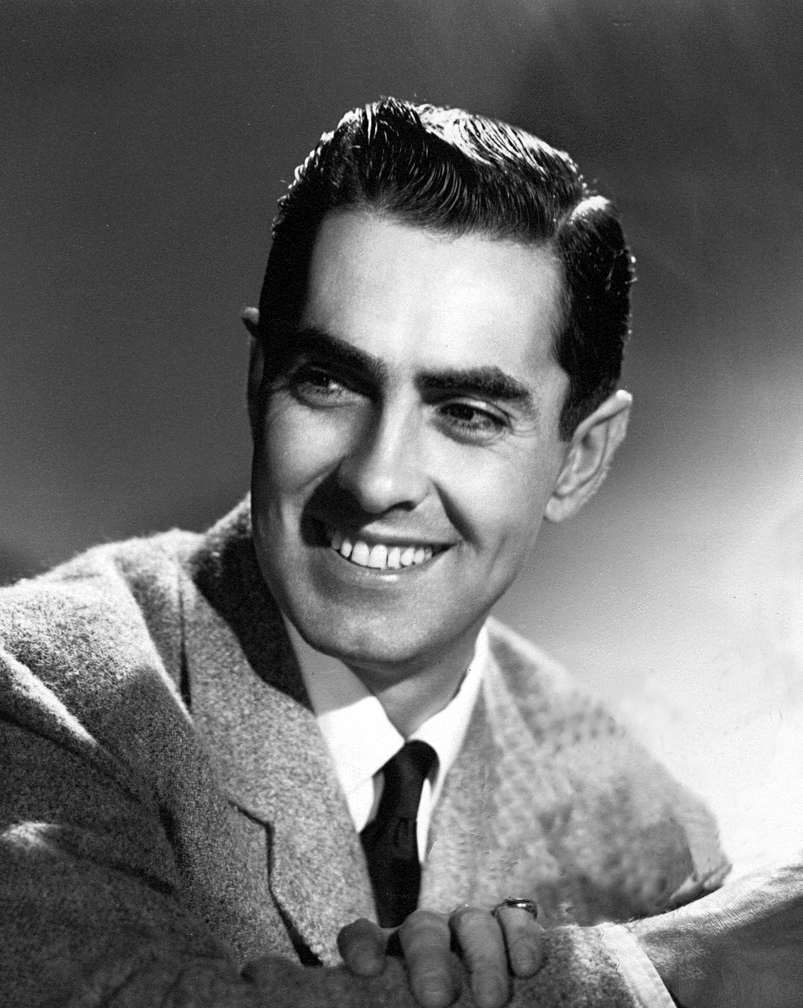
Tyrone Power

- Tyrone (producer) (born 1986), Nigerian producer
- Tyrone Berry (born 1987), English footballer
- Tyrone Bogues (born 1965), American professional basketball player
- Tyrone Braxton (born 1964), American football player
- Tyrone Broden (born 2001), American football player
- Tyrone Brunson (musician) (1956–2013), American singer
- Tyrone Corbin (born 1962), former basketball player
- Tyrone Davis (disambiguation), multiple people
- Tyrone Ellis (born 1977), American-Georgian basketball coach and player
- Tyrone Garner (disambiguation), multiple people
- Tyrone William Griffin Jr. or Ty Dolla Sign (born 1985), American singer
- Tyrone Guthrie (1900–1971), Anglo-Irish theatrical director
- Tyrone Hayes (born 1967), American biologist and professor
- Tyrone Howe (born 1971), Irish rugby union player
- Tyrone Keogh (born 1982), South African actor
- Tyrone Marshall (born 1974), Jamaican footballer
- Tyrone Mings (born 1993), English footballer
- Tyrone O'Sullivan (c. 1945–2023), Welsh trade unionist
- Tyrone Peachey (born 1991), Australian Rugby League player
- Tyrone Power (Irish actor) (1795–1841), Irish stage actor, comedian, author and theatrical manager
- Tyrone Power (1914–1958), American actor
- Tyrone Power Jr. (born 1959), American actor
- Tyrone Power Sr. (1869–1931), Anglo-American actor
- W. Tyrone Power (1819–1911), Australian artist
- Tyrone Samba (born 2007), English footballer
- Tyrone Savage (born 1985), Canadian actor
- Tyrone Tracy Jr. (born 1999), American football player
- Tyrone Unsworth (2003–2016), Australian suicide victim
- Tyrone Urch (born 1965), British general
- Tyrone Wheatley (born 1972), American football player
- Tyrone Wheatley Jr. (born 1997), American football player
- Tyrone Williams (disambiguation), multiple people
- Tyrone S. Woods (1971–2012), U.S. Navy SEAL killed in the 2012 Benghazi attack

=== Middle name ===
- Dana Tyrone Rohrabacher (born 1947), American politician
- Dwyane Tyrone Wade (born 1982), American basketball player
- Michael Tyrone Ellis (born 1967), British politician
- Stephen Tyrone Colbert (born 1964), American satirist and host of The Late Show with Stephen Colbert

== Fictional characters ==
- Tyrone Biggums, a recurring character on Chappelle's Show
- Tyrone, the friend of a freeloading boyfriend in Erykah Badu's 1997 live hit "Tyrone"
- Tyrone Slothrop, character in Thomas Pynchon's novel Gravity's Rainbow
- Tyrone Dobbs, a character on Coronation Street
- Dr. Tyrone C. Berger, a character in Judith Guest's 1976 novel Ordinary People and the 1980 film adaptation of the same name
- Tyrone, a character from The Backyardigans
- Tyrone, or T, a character from Trailer Park Boys
- Tyrone, a character in Snatch
- Tyrone King, the main villain in Dead Rising 2
- Tyrone, a character in the cartoon series Baggy Pants and the Nitwits
- James, Mary, Jamie, and Edmund Tyrone, characters in Eugene O'Neill's play Long Day's Journey into Night
- Count Tyrone Rugen, a character from The Princess Bride
- Tyrone Shoelaces, the protagonist of Cheech and Chong's "Basketball Jones"
- Tyrone "Ty" Johnson, a Marvel Comics Super-Hero who used the alias Cloak, as part of a crime-fighting duo "Cloak and Dagger". The characters were created by Bill Mantlo and Ed Hannigan in the pages of The Spectacular Spider-Man #62 from 1982.
