= Frognal House =

Mansion in London

Coordinates: 51°25′4″N 0°6′18″E

Frognal House by George Shepherd appears in Thomas Ireland's History of Kent published c. 1830

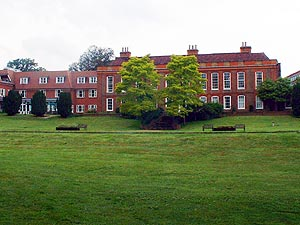
Frognal House, 2002

Frognal House is a Jacobean mansion in London, England, standing on the border of Sidcup in the London Borough of Bexley, and Chislehurst, in the London Borough of Bromley. It was built in the early 16th century.

== History ==
=== A Jacobean mansion ===
Frognal House is believed to have been built sometime before 1550 by the Dyngley (or Dynely) family, on land obtained by free warren from Henry III in 1253 by Thomas Le Barbur, and later owned by the Cressel family. Markes Dyngley died in 1550, his will stipulating that the property, while primarily owned by his second son, should have a room retained for each of his three sons. During the reign of James I, Dyngleys's grandson, Sir John Dynley, sold the estate to William Watkins, who substantially altered the building in the Jacobean style, reducing the size of the rooms and replacing stone with brick. At this point the house was on two floors and sloping ground, a square building with a central quadrangle, and an entrance on the northwest side. The only features retained from the original Tudor building were an arch and one of the staircases.

=== The Warwicks ===
In 1649, Watkins sold Frognal House to Philip Warwick, formerly MP for Radnor, concerned that, as a royalist, he might have his property seized by the victorious Parliamentarians in the Civil War. Warwick had been expelled from the House of Commons for siding with the Charles I during the civil war, but was subsequently appointed Clerk of the Signet, remaining with Charles until his imprisonment in Carisbrook Castle. After the Restoration he was elected again to parliament, and was knighted by Charles II, and made Secretary to the Treasury. Warwick was married twice, and Frognal House is recorded as a possession of Warwick's step-son by his second wife, Sir Oliver Boteler Baronet in the Hearth Tax assessment in 1662. At that time the house was the largest in the district with 24 chimneys. Warwick's death in 1682 was followed by his son's death the following year, and in 1691 the property passed to Rowland Tryon, Sir Philip Warwick's nephew.

=== The Tryons ===
Though the Tryon family were from working class origins, Rowland Tryon had become wealthy trading in the West Indies. A print from the time shows a large brick mansion built around a central courtyard, and surrounded by formal gardens, orchards, and tree-lined walkways, with a number of outbuildings that had been connected to the house via construction in about 1700. Rowland Tryon died in 1720, bequeathing the house to his brother William, a wealthy City financier and philanthropist, and later (in 1742) William's son Thomas Tryon. Both William and Thomas Tryon had served as Treasurer to the Society for the Propagation of the Gospel in Foreign Parts, but when Thomas Tryon ran into business trouble, the Society became exposed to his losses. Bankrupt, Tryon committed suicide in 1747, and Frognal House was taken over by the High Court of Chancery to be sold for the benefit of his creditors.

=== The Townshends ===
Frognal House was purchased by Thomas Townshend in 1752 and became the residence of his son, Thomas Townshend, 1st Viscount Sydney, after whom Sydney, Australia was named. On his death in 1800, Frognal House was inherited by his son John Thomas Townshend, who added a billiard room within the quadrangle, using panelling taken from a neighbouring house. His son, John Robert Townshend, who inherited the house on his death in 1831, was married to Emily, daughter of the Marquess of Anglesey, second-in-command to the Duke of Wellington at the Battle of Waterloo, who often stayed at the house and gave his name to a room decorated with his family's paintings. John Robert Townshend was a member of the royal household, serving as Lord Chamberlain (1859-1866 and 1868–1874) and Lord Steward (1880-1885). He was also created an earl in 1874, though he had no children and the title died with him on his death at Frognal House in 1890. Upon his wife's death in 1893 the house passed into the hands of his sister's son, Robert Marsham, on condition that he added Townshend to his name. In 1915, the Marsham-Townshend family sold the house and 1,740-acre (7.0 km^{2}) estate to the government to build a new hospital. At the same time the contents of the house were sold in an auction, including 284 paintings, 1048 books and a huge collection of furniture and antiques.

=== Hospital and modern use ===
The house was then subsequently used as the original building of the Queen's Hospital (later Queen Mary's Hospital), Sidcup, developed as the First World War's major centre for facial and plastic surgery, largely through the efforts of Harold Gillies. Opened in 1917, the hospital and its associated convalescent hospitals provided over 1,000 beds, and between 1917 and 1921 admitted in excess of 5,000 servicemen. The original hospital closed in 1929, re-opening the following year under the management of London County Council.

In 1974, a new Queen Mary's Hospital was built to replace the original Great War hospital, and since November 1999 Frognal House has been a residential and nursing home run by Sunrise Senior Living, their first location in the United Kingdom. In 2021, the property was taken over by Signature Senior Lifestyle.

The house gave its name to the nearby Frognal Corner, once a crossroads where the Sidcup Bypass crossed Perry Street and, since 1987, a grade-separated junction at the intersection of the A20 and the A222.
