= Tyrone Township =

Tyrone Township may refer to:

- Tyrone Township, Franklin County, Illinois
- Tyrone Township, Kent County, Michigan
- Tyrone Township, Livingston County, Michigan
- Tyrone Township, Le Sueur County, Minnesota
- Tyrone Township, Williams County, North Dakota, in Williams County, North Dakota
- Tyrone Township, Adams County, Pennsylvania
- Tyrone Township, Blair County, Pennsylvania
- Tyrone Township, Perry County, Pennsylvania

== See also ==
- Tyrone (disambiguation)
