= Tyron =

Tyron is a male given name:

- Tyron Brackenridge (born 1984), Canadian football defensive backs coach
- Tyron Carrier (born 1987), American athlete who was formerly a wide receiver
- Tyron Frampton (born 1994), British rapper better known as Slowthai
- Tyron Henderson (born 1974), South African professional cricketer
- Tyron Ivanof (born 1997), Belgian footballer
- Tyron Johnson (born 1996), American football player
- Tyron Koen (born 1997), South African cricketer
- Tyron Leitso (born 1976), Canadian actor
- Tyron McCoy (born 1972), American professional basketball coach, and former professional basketball player
- Tyron Perez (1985–2011), Filipino model, actor and television host
- Tyron Silvapulle (1966-1999), Sri Lankan pilot
- Tyron Smith (born 1990), American football offensive tackle
- Tyron Uy (born 1985), Filipino politician
- Tyron Wijewardene (born 1961), former Sri Lankan cricketer and current cricket umpire
- Tyron Woodley (born 1982), American professional mixed martial artist, rapper, broadcast analyst, and former UFC Welterweight Champion
- Tyron Zeuge (born 1992), German professional boxer

== See also ==
- Tyron (album), by Slowthai, 2021
- Tryon (disambiguation)
- Tyrone (name)
