= Djoumin Sangaré =

French footballer (born 1983)

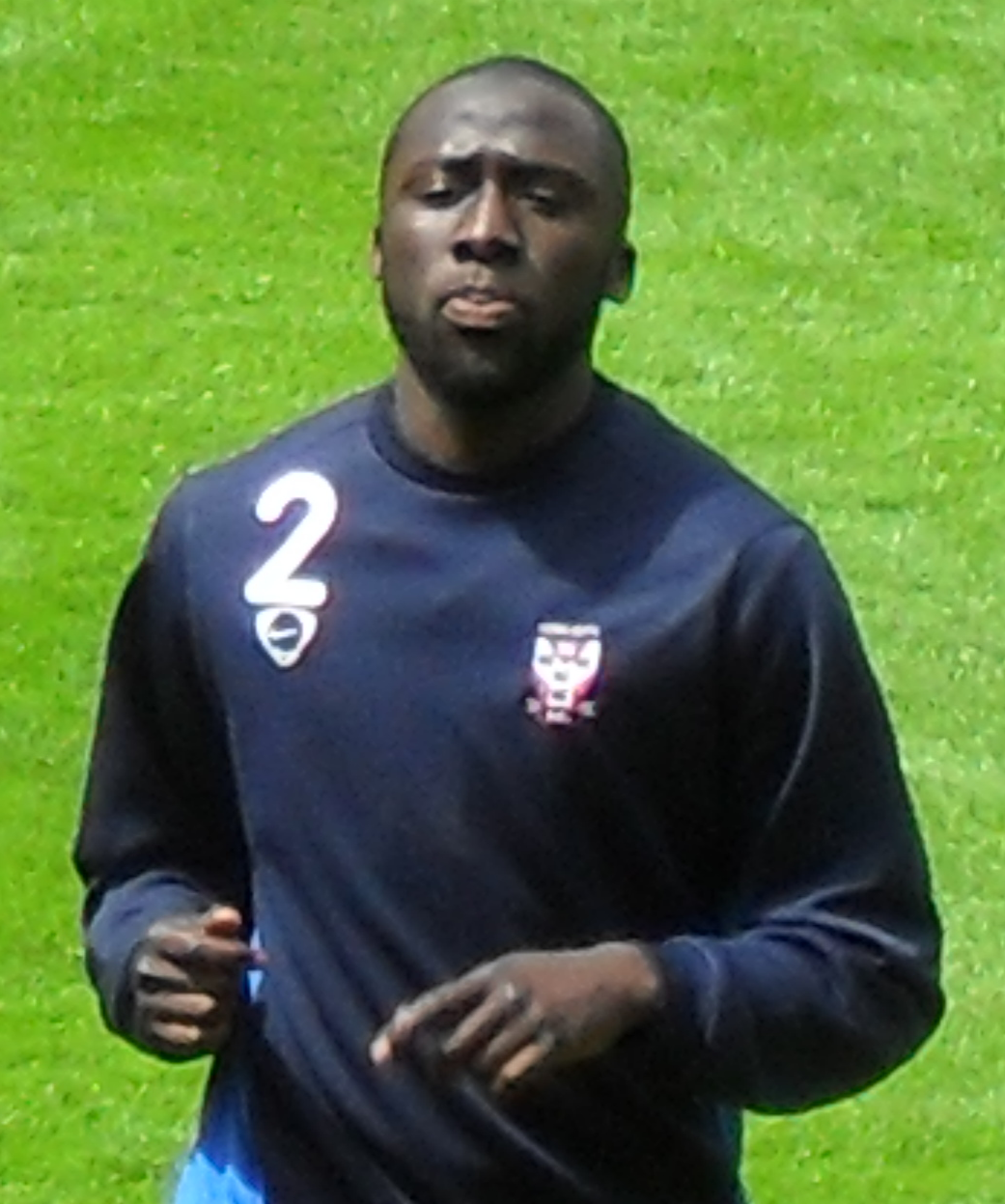
- Sangaré training with York City in 2009

Personal information
- Full name: Djoumin Sangaré
- Date of birth: 16 December 1983 (age 42)
- Place of birth: Dunkirk, France
- Height: 6 ft 1 in (1.85 m)
- Position: Defender

Youth career
- 1993–2000: USL Dunkerque
- 2000–2003: ES Wasquehal

Senior career*
Years	Team	Apps	(Gls)
2003–2004	ES Wasquehal	4	(0)
2004–2005	Redbridge	6	(1)
2005	Chelmsford City	0	(0)
2005	Redbridge	6	(0)
2005–2006	Lewes	25	(1)
2005	→ St Albans City (loan)	5	(1)
2006–2007	Grays Athletic	8	(0)
2007	→ St Albans City (loan)	17	(2)
2007–2008	Stafford Rangers	34	(2)
2008–2009	Salisbury City	17	(2)
2009–2010	York City	32	(3)
2011	Oxford United	4	(0)
2011–2012	Kettering Town	30	(4)
2012–2013	AS Lyon-Duchère	16	(1)
2013–20??	Gravelines	?	(?)
- * Club domestic league appearances and goals as of 17:34, 24 August 2014 (UTC)

Djoumin Sangaré (born 16 December 1983), also known as Jimmy Sangaré, is a French former professional footballer who played as a defender in France, in the UK, and in Morocco.

== Career ==
Born in Dunkirk, Nord, Sangaré started playing for the USL Dunkerque youth system in 1993, but at the age of 16 in 2000 he joined the ES Wasquehal youth system. While at university, where he studied for a sports science degree, he earned a professional contract with Wasquehal and was included on the substitutes' bench in a Ligue 2 game against SM Caen towards the end of the 2002–03 season. He trained with Wasquehal in the morning and studied in the afternoon and made four appearances in the Championnat National during the 2003–04 season. For the third year of his degree he moved to England to study at the University of Roehampton, and signed for Conference South club Redbridge in September 2004. After scoring on his debut in a 3–1 victory over Havant & Waterlooville he made six appearances for Redbridge before moving to Isthmian League Premier Division club Chelmsford City in January 2005, where he played one game in the Isthmian League Cup, in a 1–0 victory at Hertford Town on 3 January. He returned to Redbridge later in January and made another seven appearances for the club in the 2004–05 season, which concluded with the club being relegated to the Isthmian League Premier Division. He signed for Conference South team Lewes in the summer of 2005 and joined St Albans City on a one-month loan in August 2005. After making five appearances and scoring on goal for St Albans he returned to Lewes. He finished the 2005–06 season with 26 appearances and one goal for the club.

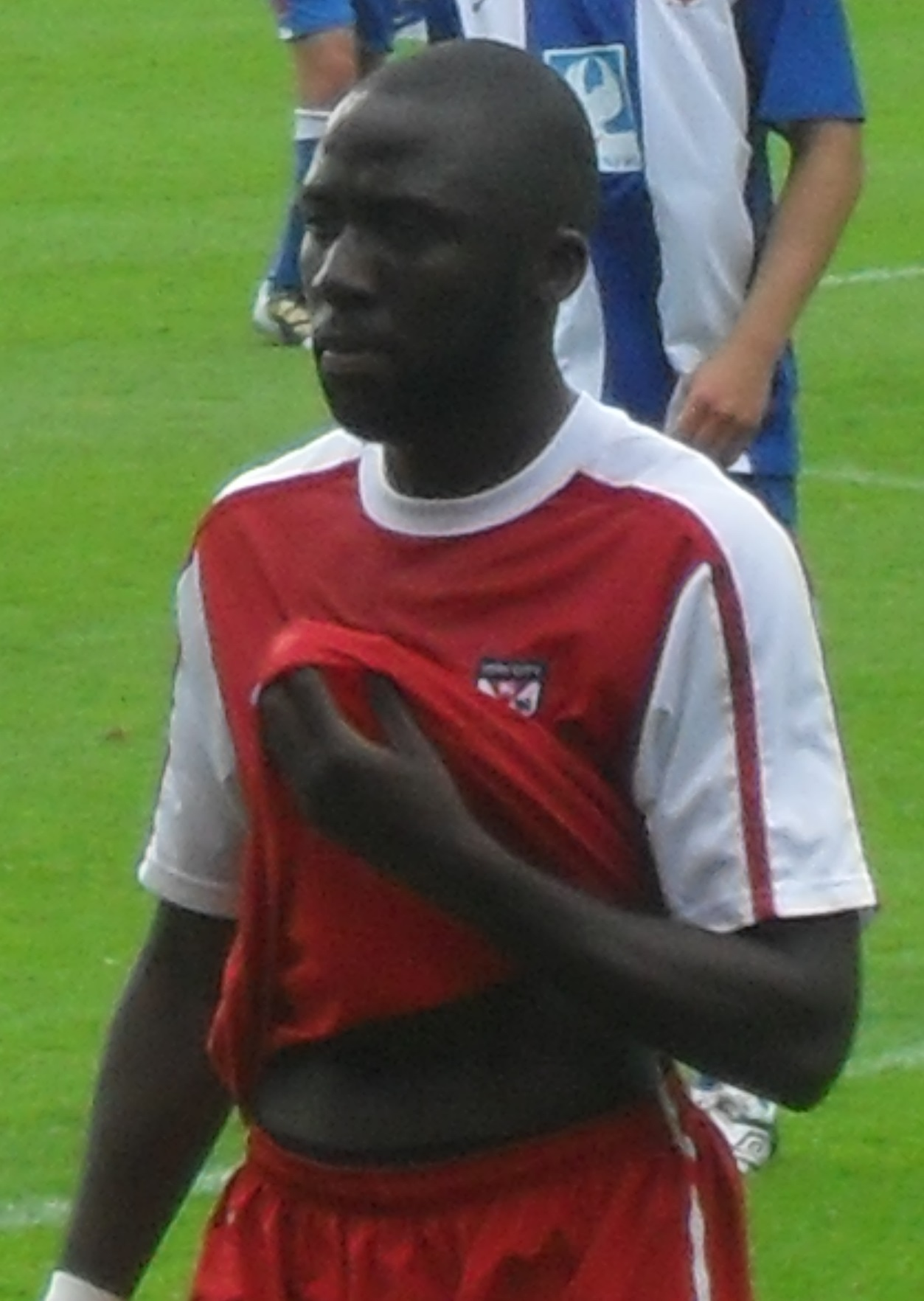
Sangaré playing for York City in 2010

Sangaré signed for Conference National club Grays Athletic on a one-year contract in August 2006. He made eight appearances before being loaned out to Conference National side St Albans for the rest of the 2006–07 season in January 2007. He made 17 appearances and scored two goals for St Albans as they were relegated to the Conference South. After being released by Grays he joined Conference Premier club Stafford Rangers in July 2007 and finished the 2007–08 season with 39 appearances and two goals. Sangaré moved to Conference Premier team Salisbury City in July 2008 following a trial and he made 20 appearances in the 2008–09 season.

He joined Conference Premier club York City on 25 July 2009 after impressing on trial. Following the end of the 2009–10 season, which he finished with 28 appearances and three goals, Sangaré signed a new six-month contract with York. He agreed to sign for Moroccan Botola champions Wydad Casablanca following the expiry of his York contract on 31 December 2010, but after this fell through he returned to England in January 2011 for a trial with League Two club Lincoln City. After being offered a contract for the rest of the 2010–11 season Sangaré signed instead for fellow League Two side Oxford United on 13 January. He made his debut for Oxford as a substitute in their 2–1 home victory over Bradford City on 15 January 2011. Sangaré broke his metatarsal bone in April 2011, and having made four appearances was released by Oxford in May.

Sangaré went on to join Kettering Town on a two-year contract ahead of the 2011–12 season on 28 July 2011. On 30 September 2011, he was one of eleven players transfer-listed by Kettering. He finished the 2011–12 season with 32 appearances and four goals for Kettering. Sangaré returned to France to play for AS Lyon-Duchère of the Championnat de France amateur during 2012 and made 16 appearances and scored one goal in the 2012–13 season. He joined Championnat de France amateur 2 team US Gravelines in 2013 and played 16 games in the 2013–14 season.

== Career statistics ==
As of match played 5 April 2014.

Appearances and goals by club, season and competition
Club	Season	League			National cup		League cup		Other		Total	
Club	Season	Division	Apps	Goals	Apps	Goals	Apps	Goals	Apps	Goals	Apps	Goals
ES Wasquehal	2002–03	Ligue 2	0	0					—		0	0
ES Wasquehal	2003–04	Championnat National	4	0	0	0	0	0	—		4	0
ES Wasquehal	Total		4	0	0	0	0	0	—		4	0
Redbridge	2004–05	Conference South	6	1	0	0	—		0	0	6	1
Chelmsford City	2004–05	Isthmian Premier Division	0	0	0	0	—		1 (Note: Appearance in Isthmian League Cup)	0	1	0
Redbridge	2004–05	Conference South	6	0	0	0	—		1 (Note: Appearance(s) in FA Trophy)	0	7	0
Lewes	2005–06	Conference South	25	1	1	0	—		0	0	26	1
St Albans City (loan)	2005–06	Conference South	5	1	0	0	—		0	0	5	1
Grays Athletic	2006–07	Conference National	8	0	0	0	—		0	0	8	0
St Albans City (loan)	2006–07	Conference National	17	2	0	0	—		0	0	17	2
Stafford Rangers	2007–08	Conference Premier	34	2	2	0	—		3	0	39	2
Salisbury City	2008–09	Conference Premier	17	2	0	0	—		3 (Note: One appearance in Conference League Cup, two in FA Trophy)	0	20	2
York City	2009–10	Conference Premier	22	3	1	0	—		5 (Note: Three appearances in FA Trophy, two in Conference Premier play-offs)	0	28	3
York City	2010–11	Conference Premier	10	0	3	1	—		1	0	14	1
York City	Total		32	3	4	1	—		6	0	42	4
Oxford United	2010–11	League Two	4	0	0	0	0	0	0	0	4	0
Kettering Town	2011–12	Conference Premier	30	4	2	0	—		0	0	32	4
Lyon-Duchère	2012–13	CFA	16	1			—		—		16	1
Gravelines	2013–14	CFA 2	16	0			—		—		16	0
Career total			220	17	9	1	0	0	14	0	243	18
