= Tyrone Township, Pennsylvania =

Tyrone Township is the name of some places in the U.S. state of Pennsylvania:

- Tyrone Township, Adams County, Pennsylvania
- Tyrone Township, Blair County, Pennsylvania
- Tyrone Township, Perry County, Pennsylvania

== See also ==
- Lower Tyrone Township, Pennsylvania
- Upper Tyrone Township, Fayette County, Pennsylvania
