= Kate Tryon =

American journalist (1865–1952)

Kate Allen Tryon
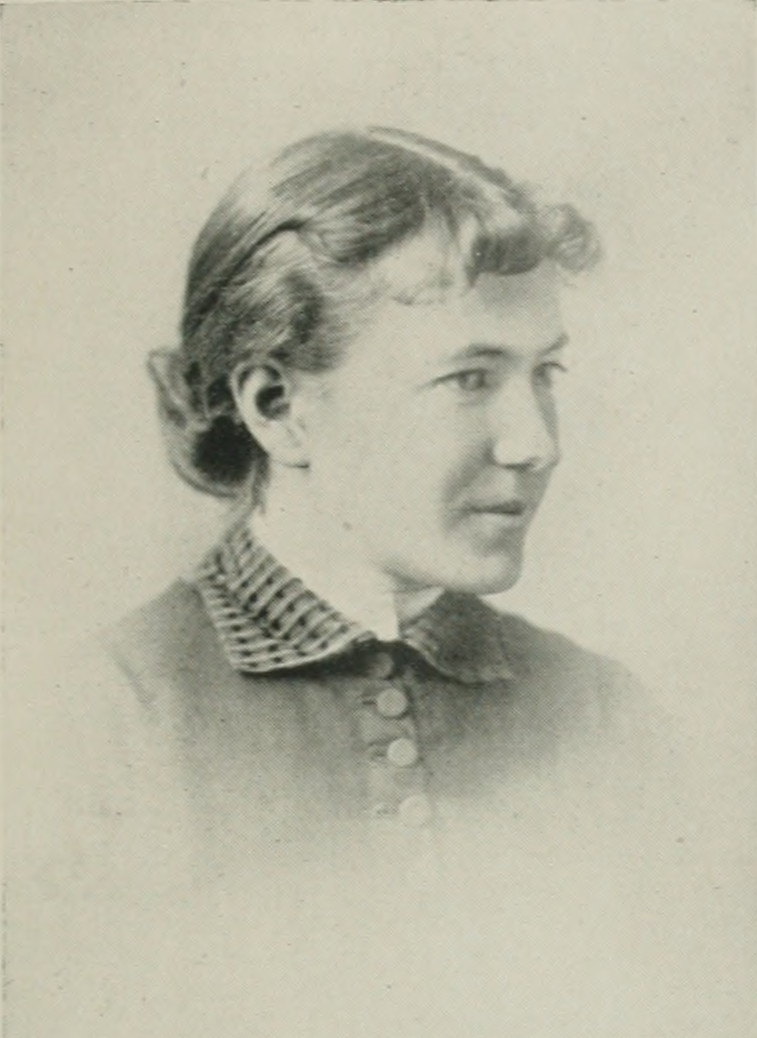
- Kate Tryon, A woman of the century
- Born: March 18, 1865; Naples, Maine, U.S.
- Died: 1952 (aged 86–87)
- Occupation(s): Journalist, artist, lecturer
- Known for: Journalism, lectures on New England's wild song-birds

Kate Allen Tryon (March 18, 1865 – 1952) was a journalist, artist and lecturer.

== Early life ==
Kate Allen Tryon was born in the village of Naples, Maine, on March 18, 1865. She was the daughter of Charles A. Allen, of Portland, Maine.

She attended the Boston Museum of Fine Arts.

== Career ==
For three years after their marriage, Tryon's husband was local editor of Portland and Bangor newspapers, and Tryon, as his associate, gained a wide experience in journalism. In the fall of 1889 Tryon's husband was able to fulfill his long-cherished plan of studying at Harvard University and they moved to Cambridge, Massachusetts.

As member of the staff of the Boston Advertiser and its allied evening paper, the Boston Record, Tryon's name became well known to the newspaper-readers of New England. In 1891 she lectured upon the subject of New England's wild song-birds, her field being mostly in the scores of literary and educational clubs which abounded in Massachusetts. She supplemented her lectures by illustrations in the shape of water-color drawings of each bird made by herself, showing its characteristic attitude and background.

When not actively engaged in newspaper work in Boston, she was especially happy as an interviewer.

She first visited Swindon, Wiltshire, in 1910, and she returned 5 other times: "The lark, the nightingale and Richard Jefferies – those are the three things that brought me to England"; the output of these visits is a vast array of paintings. Richard Jefferies (1848–1887) was a Swindon poet.

== Personal life ==
In school in Portland she met James Libbey Tryon and became his wife in Massena, New York.

She died in 1952.

== Legacy ==
In 1963 her daughter Sylvia Kramer donated 35 paintings of her mother to the Richard Jefferies Museum at Coate Farmhouse; some of these paintings are now in the Swindon Museum and Art Gallery Collection.

In 1997 her granddaughter Kate Schneider donated to the Richard Jefferies Society an unpublished typed manuscript based on Tryon's visits to Swindon. It was published in 2010 as Adventures in the Vale of the White Horse "Jefferies Land": Featuring Kate Tryon's Original Paintings and Photographs from Her Visits to the Area.
