= Carlos Logan =

English footballer (born 1985)

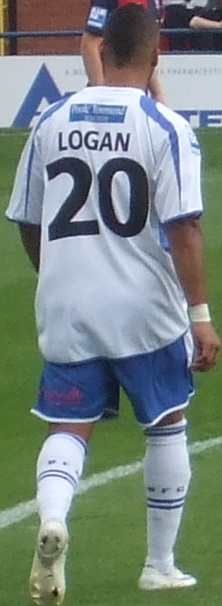
- Logan playing for Barrow in 2008

Personal information
- Full name: Carlos Sean Logan
- Date of birth: 7 November 1985 (age 40)
- Place of birth: Wythenshawe, Manchester, England
- Height: 5 ft 10 in (1.78 m)
- Position: Midfielder

Youth career
- 2001–2004: Manchester City

Senior career*
Years	Team	Apps	(Gls)
2004–2005	Manchester City	0	(0)
2005	→ Chesterfield (loan)	9	(1)
2005–2007	Darlington	42	(4)
2007	→ Bradford City (loan)	4	(0)
2007–2008	Altrincham	19	(0)
2008–2010	Barrow	78	(3)
2010	Hyde	7	(0)
2011	Northwich Victoria	1	(0)
2011–2013	Droylsden	45	(6)
2013	Ashton United		
2013–2014	Buxton		
- * Club domestic league appearances and goals as of 1 November 2012

Carlos Sean Logan (born 7 November 1985) is an English footballer who plays in midfield. He made over 50 appearances in The Football League between 2005 and 2007.

== Career ==
=== Early career ===
Born in Wythenshawe, Manchester, Logan began his professional career as a trainee at Manchester City in 2004, and joined Chesterfield on loan in March 2005, where he made nine appearances, scoring one goal.

He was released by Manchester City in August 2005 on a free transfer and joined Darlington, where he became a regular in the team, making 34 league and cup appearances in the 2005–06 season. However, after starting only twice in the 2006–07 season, he joined Bradford City on a one-month loan in January 2007, where he made four appearances. He returned to Darlington but was released in the summer of 2007, having made 49 league and cup appearances for the club.

He signed for non-League club Altrincham in September 2007 but failed to settle and left the club in February 2008.

=== Barrow ===
He moved to Barrow, of the Conference National, before the start of the 2008–09 season. Logan spent two season with Barrow, spending a significant part of his first season playing in the new position of left back. He was released in May 2010, having played in the 2009–10 FA Trophy winning team at Wembley Stadium.

He left Barrow at the end of the 2009–10 season after his contract expired. Later on in the summer he joined Hyde.

=== Hyde ===
He move to Hyde in August 2010, and made his debut on 14 August in a 3–2 home defeat to Workington. On 29 September 2010, he was released from Hyde because he did not make the impression they thought he would. He spent almost 2 months at Hyde making a total of 9 appearances scoring 0 goals.

=== Northwich Victoria and Droylsden ===
On 8 December 2010, Carlos joined AFC Telford United on trial after being released from Hyde, but he later chose to sign for Northwich Victoria in the Northern Premier League Premier Division. In March 2011 he left Northwich and joined Droylsden.

In 2013 he joined Ashton United in the summer before moving to Buxton in October.

== Personal life ==
Carlos is the older brother of Shaleum Logan.
