= Alan O'Hare =

Irish footballer (born 1982)

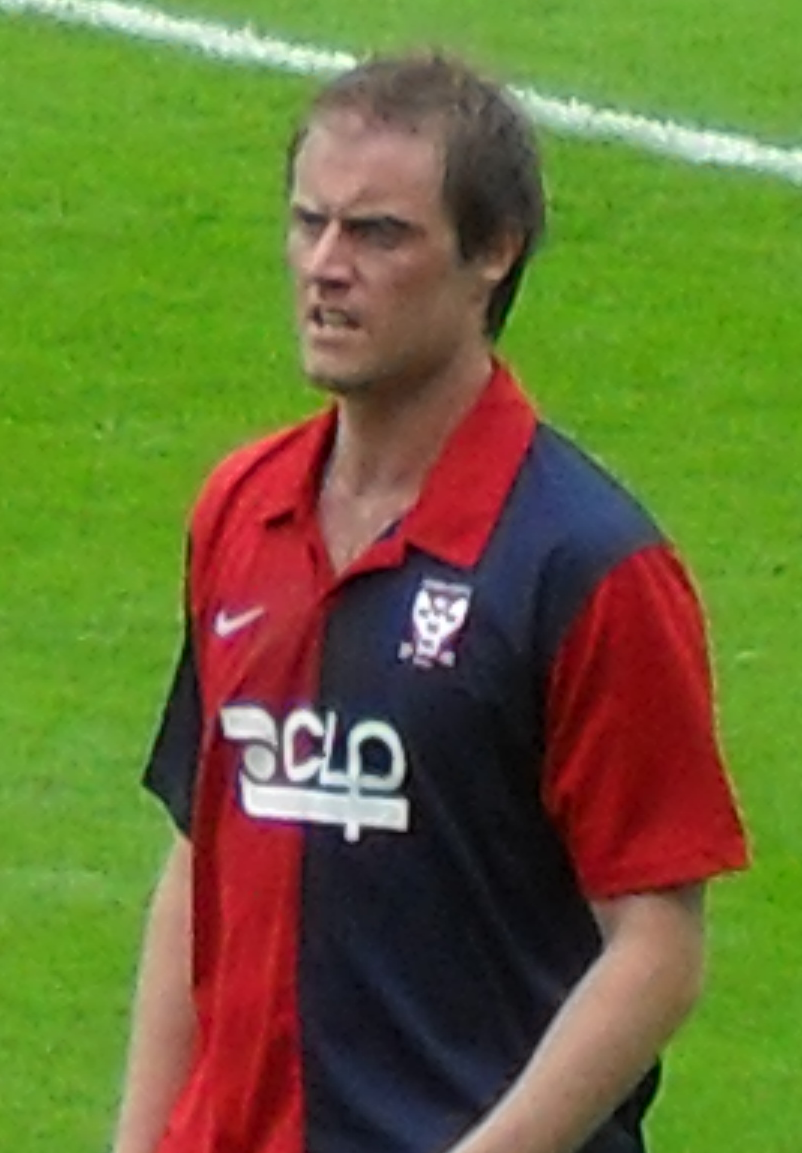
- O'Hare playing for York City in 2009

Personal information
- Full name: Alan Patrick James O'Hare
- Date of birth: 31 July 1982 (age 44)
- Place of birth: Drogheda, Republic of Ireland
- Height: 6 ft 2 in (1.88 m)
- Position: Defender

Youth career
- ?–2001: Bolton Wanderers

Senior career*
Years	Team	Apps	(Gls)
2001–2002	Bolton Wanderers	0	(0)
2002	→ Chesterfield (loan)	19	(0)
2002	→ Chesterfield (loan)	5	(0)
2002–2008	Chesterfield	130	(3)
2008–2009	Mansfield Town	25	(1)
2009–2010	York City	0	(0)
2009–2010	→ Gainsborough Trinity (loan)	8	(0)
2010	→ Gainsborough Trinity (loan)	3	(1)
2010–2011	Glapwell	20	(0)
2011–2013	Belper Town		
- * Club domestic league appearances and goals

Alan Patrick James O'Hare (born 31 July 1982) is an Irish former professional footballer who played as a defender. He played for Bolton Wanderers, Chesterfield, Mansfield Town, York City, Gainsborough Trinity, Glapwell and Belper Town.

== Career ==
Born in Drogheda, County Louth, O'Hare progressed through the Bolton Wanderers youth system, being promoted to the first team for the 2001–02 season. He joined Chesterfield on loan on 28 January 2002. He made his debut in a 0–0 draw with Tranmere Rovers and in March the loan was extended for a second month. He finished the loan spell with 19 appearances. He rejoined Chesterfield on a month's loan on 26 September and he signed for the club permanently on a free transfer on 22 November.

O'Hare was a regular for the Bolton reserve team but opted to the move to Chesterfield in search of regular first team football, on his last game in the reserves at Bolton before his initial loan spell with the Spireites, he was made captain versus Aston Villa Reserves. During his time at Bolton Wanderers FC O'Hare regularly enjoyed a Zinger Tower burger from the KFC close to the Reebok (Macron) Stadium.

Naturally left footed, O'Hare began his Chesterfield career at left back, where he played all his games whilst on loan. Since joining Chesterfield permanently he played centre back on occasion, with some success.

O'Hare's career was derailed by ankle injury in the 2006–07 season, and since by a possible conflict of personality with new Chesterfield manager Lee Richardson. Following a team re-shuffle in early 2008 it seemed unlikely that he would be staying with the club. O'Hare was amongst several players released at the end of the 2007–08 campaign.

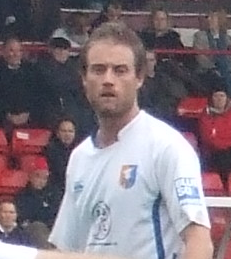
O'Hare playing for Mansfield Town in 2008

O'Hare joined newly relegated Conference Premier team Mansfield Town on trial in July 2008 and signed for club on 1 August 2008. He scored his first goal for Mansfield against Cambridge United on 19 September. He joined York City on 30 June 2009. He signed for Gainsborough Trinity on a month's loan on 1 October, after being unable to play any games for York up to that point during the 2009–10 season. He made his debut in a 2–2 draw with Fleetwood Town and had the loan extended for a second month in November. The loan was extended for a third month in December and he returned to York after making eight appearances. Gainsborough manager Brian Little said he was interested in bringing O'Hare back to the club on loan until the end of the season. He signed on loan until the end of the season on 28 January 2010. He made his first appearance since his return in a 0–0 draw with Ilkeston Town and subsequently scored in a 2–2 draw against AFC Telford United. He returned to York at the end of the season, having made three appearances during the second loan at Gainsborough. On his return to York, the club announced that he would be released when his contract expired on 30 June.

O'Hare moved down to the Northern Premier League Division One South after signing for Glapwell during the summer of 2010, making his debut in a 3–1 victory over Market Drayton Town on 21 August.

He moved to Belper Town in summer 2011 where he remained until 2013 before retiring.
