= Tryon (surname) =

Tryon is an English surname. Notable people with the surname include:

- Charles Tryon, 2nd Baron Tryon (1906–1976), British peer
- Chloe Tryon (born 1994), South African cricketer
- Darrell Tryon (1942–2013), Australian linguist
- Dwight William Tryon (1849–1925), American painter
- Edward Tryon (fl. 20th century), American physicist
- George Tryon (1832–1893), British naval officer
- George Tryon, 1st Baron Tryon (1871–1940), British peer
- George Washington Tryon, Jr. (1838–1888), American malacologist
- James R. Tryon (1837–1912), American naval doctor and Surgeon General of the United States Navy
- Joe Tryon-Shoyinka (born 1999), American football player
- Justin Tryon (born 1984), American football player
- Kate Tryon (1865–1952), American journalist, artist and lecturer
- Richard Tryon (1837–1905), British Army officer and cricketer
- Richard T. Tryon, retired U.S. Marine lieutenant general.
- Robert Tryon (1901–1967), American behavioral psychologist/geneticist
- Rolla M. Tryon Jr. (1916–2001), American botanist
- Thomas Tryon (1634–1703), British vegetarian
- Thomas Tryon (architect) (1859–1920), American architect
- Tom Tryon (1926–1991), American actor and author
- Ty Tryon (born 1984), American professional golfer
- Valerie Tryon (born 1934), Canadian pianist
- William Tryon (1729–1788), British colonial governor in America
