= Tyrone Williams =

Tyrone Williams may refer to:

- Tyrone Williams (cornerback) (born 1973), American NFL player for the Green Bay Packers
- Tyrone Williams (wide receiver) (born 1970), Canadian journeyman in the NFL and CFL
- Tyrone Williams (defensive tackle) (born 1972), Canadian gridiron football player
- Tyrone Williams (footballer, born 1994), English footballer
- Tyrone Williams (jockey) (died 2021), British jockey, winner of the 1997 Ebor Handicap
