= Simon Miotto =

Australian footballer (born 1969)

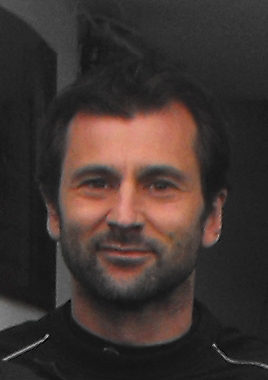
- Miotto in 2010

Personal information
- Full name: Simon Jon Miotto
- Date of birth: 5 September 1969 (age 57)
- Place of birth: Launceston, Australia
- Height: 1.85 m (6 ft 1 in)
- Position: Goalkeeper

Senior career*
Years	Team	Apps	(Gls)
1994	Riverside Olympic	?	(?)
1994–1995	Blackpool	0	(0)
1998–1999	Hartlepool United	5	(0)
1999–2000	Gippsland Falcons	0	(0)
2000	Scunthorpe United	0	(0)
2001–2002	Raith Rovers	9	(0)
2003	St Johnstone	0	(0)
2004–2005	West Bromwich Albion	0	(0)
2005–2006	Ølstykke FC	13	(0)
2006–2008	Akademisk Boldklub	?	(?)
2008	Køge BK	4	(0)
2009	Herfølge Boldklub	?	(?)
2010	York City	0	(0)
2010–2011	Tranmere Rovers	0	(0)
Total		31	(0)
- * Club domestic league appearances and goals as of 23:59, 30 June 2010 (UTC)

Simon Jon Miotto (born 5 September 1969) is an Australian former footballer. He was last contracted to Tranmere Rovers as a goalkeeper, where he was also goalkeeper coach.

== Career ==
Born in Launceston, Tasmania, Miotto is an Education graduate from the University of Canberra. He was a promising track and field athlete and was part of the national training programme at the Australian Institute of Sport. As a triple jumper he attained a high national ranking and was regarded as a potential Olympian for 1992, but in 1990 he suffered an injury that led to him playing football as a goalkeeper, beginning his career in 1994 with Riverside Olympic, even though he had strong family ties to Launceston City FC. During this time, he put his degree to good use by teaching at St Patrick’s College, Launceston. In 1994, he was signed by Blackpool manager Sam Allardyce. He spent one season at Bloomfield Road before a serious hand injury threatened his career. He recovered and returned to Blackpool under manager Gary Megson 18 months later. In July 1998 he moved to Hartlepool United, for whom he made five appearances in two years, making his professional debut at the age of 29.

He joined Scunthorpe United for a brief period in 2000, and then moved to Scotland with Raith Rovers in May 2001. He joined St Johnstone in February 2003, proving popular with supporters of the Perthshire club, winning a fans' favourite award without playing a first team game.

The following year, West Bromwich Albion manager Gary Megson signed his former goalkeeper until the end of the 2003–04 season in March 2004. Albion won promotion to the Premier League that season and in the summer, Miotto was given a one-year contract extension at The Hawthorns. That season, working alongside Russell Hoult and Tomasz Kuszczak, Miotto's importance in the dressing room was recognised by his playing colleagues by being voted onto the players' leadership group, while he also contributed a regular column to the club's matchday programme, Albion News. His standing at The Hawthorns was further recognised in 2012 when he was asked to contribute to "In Pastures Green" by Chris Lepkowski, a book dedicated to one of Albion's most successful recent eras, from 2000 to 2010.

In January 2006, Miotto joined Danish First Division club Ølstykke FC in July, helping them avoid relegation. He moved to Akademisk Boldklub in 2007, leaving in June 2008 to sign for Køge BK in July. The following season he signed for Herfølge Boldklub in January 2009, seeing the club promoted to the Danish Superliga before departing in June.

He joined Conference Premier team York City on 12 February 2010 as player and goalkeeper coach, providing playing cover for Michael Ingham and Josh Mimms. After the end of the 2009–10 season, shortly after seeing York lose the play-off final to Oxford United at Wembley, Miotto was appointed goalkeeper coach at League One team Tranmere Rovers. At 41, Miotto decided to retire from football and left Tranmere on 2 March 2011 to pursue other business interests.

Miotto now owns a successful sports management company and has been responsible for mentoring and developing a number of youth international footballers and has been involved with several international football transfers.
