= Tyrone Township, Livingston County, Michigan =

Tyrone Township, Michigan
- Civil township
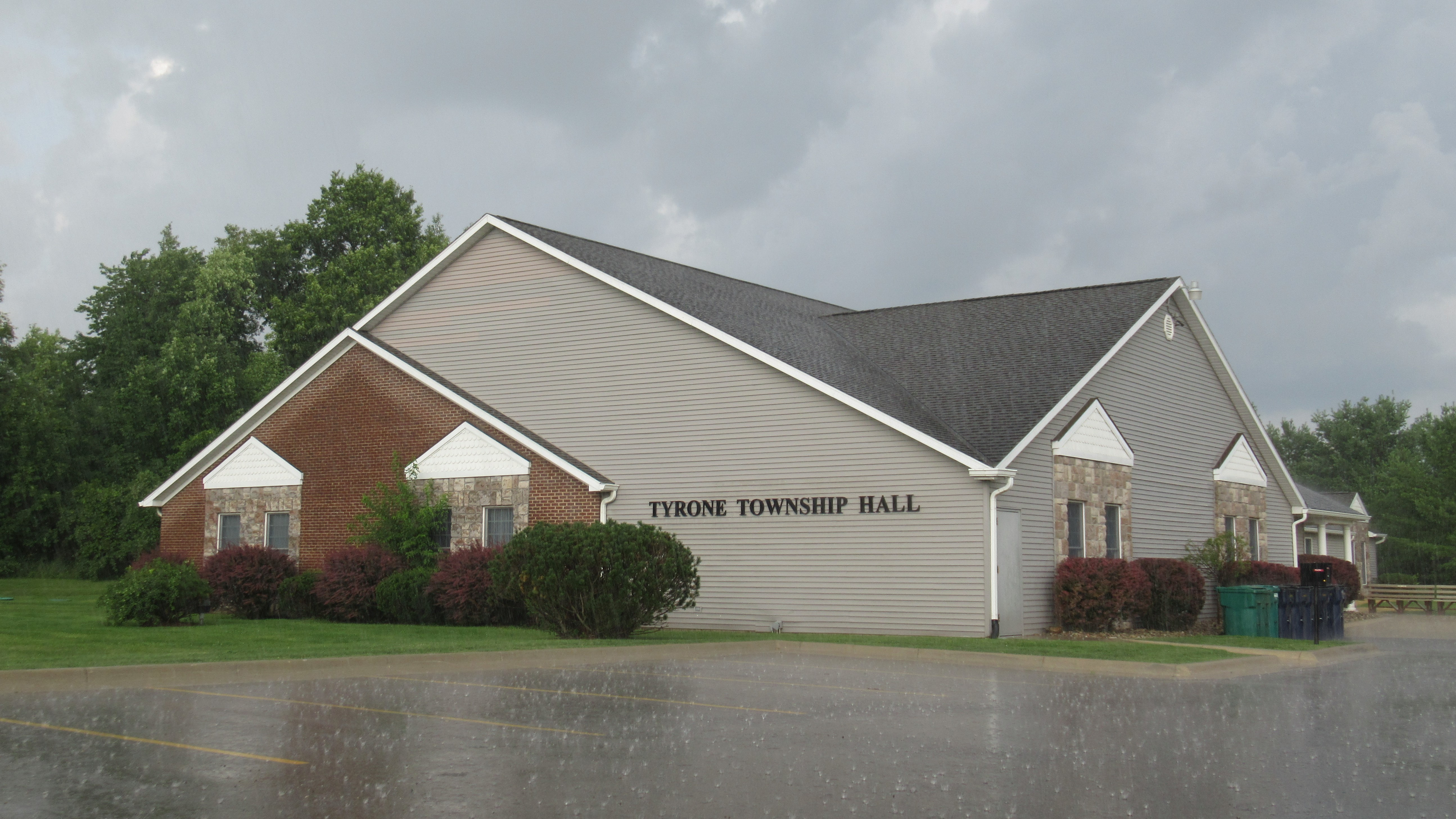
- Tyrone Township Hall

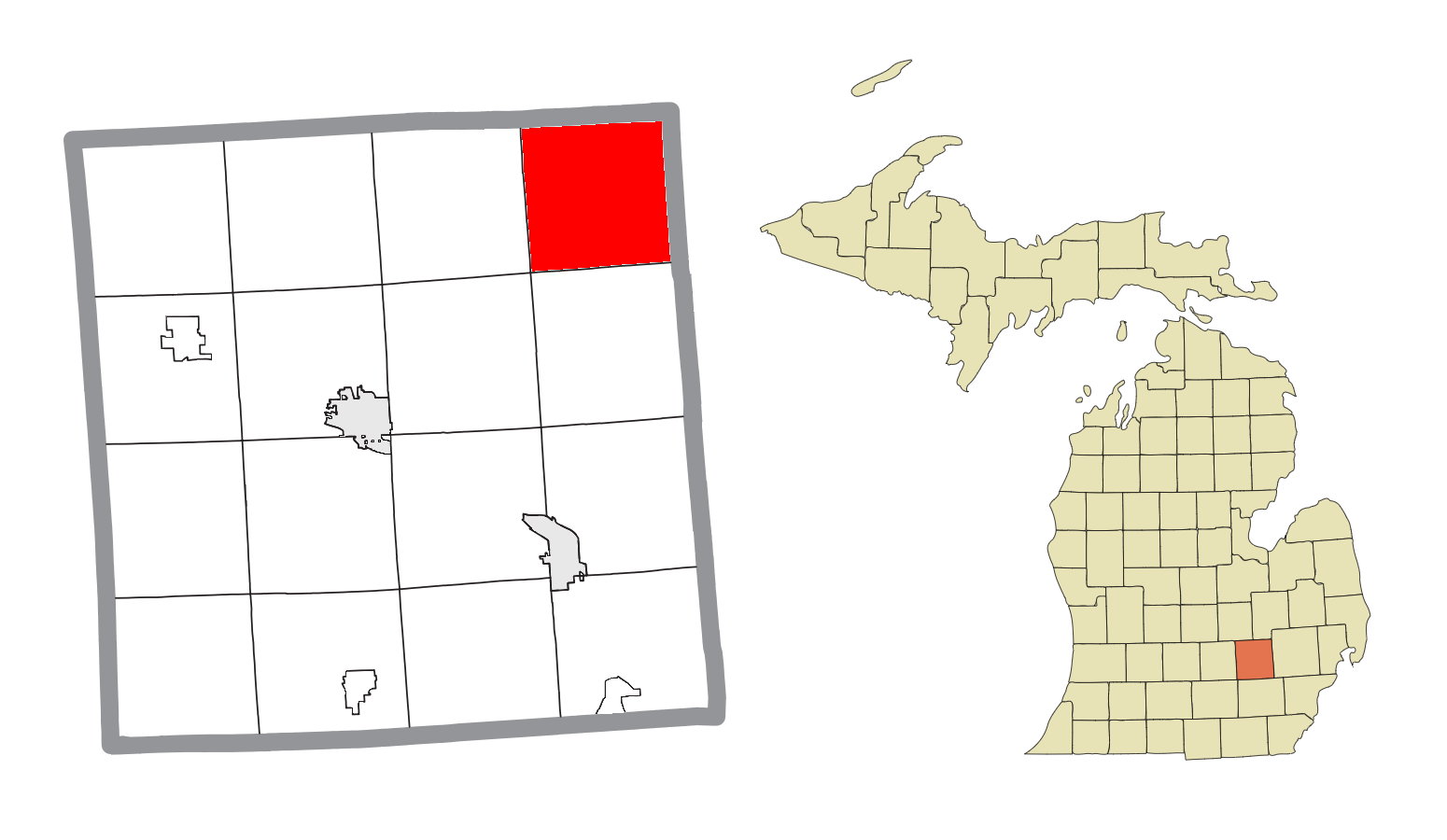
- Location within Livingston County

- Location in Michigan Location in the United States
- Coordinates: 42°44′34″N 83°45′15″W
- Country: United States
- State: Michigan
- County: Livingston
- Established: 1834

Government
  - Supervisor: Mike Cunningham
  - Clerk: Marcella Husted

Area
  - Total: 36.7 sq mi (95.1 km^{2})
  - Land: 35.4 sq mi (91.8 km^{2})
  - Water: 1.2 sq mi (3.2 km^{2}) 3.4%
- Elevation: 948 ft (289 m)

Population (2020)
  - Total: 11,986
  - Density: 338/sq mi (131/km^{2})
- Time zone: UTC-5 (Eastern (EST))
  - Summer (DST): UTC-4 (EDT)
- ZIP code(s): 48430 (Fenton)
- Area code: 810
- FIPS code: 26-81160
- GNIS feature ID: 1627182
- Website: www.tyronetownship.us

Tyrone Township is a civil township of Livingston County in the U.S. state of Michigan. The population was 11,986 at the 2020 census, up from 10,020 at the 2010 census.

The township was named after County Tyrone in Northern Ireland.

== Communities ==
- Hallers Corners is an unincorporated community at the border with Hartland Township at Denton Hill and Holtforth roads.(42°41′41″N 83°42′13″W).
- Tyrone Center is an unincorporated community at Foley and Hartland roads.

== Geography ==
Tyrone Township occupies the northeast corner of Livingston County, bordered to the north by Genesee County and to the east by Oakland County. U.S. Route 23 crosses the township, with access from Exits 75 and 77. US 23 leads north 20 miles (32 km) to Flint and south 34 miles (55 km) to Ann Arbor.

According to the United States Census Bureau, the township has a total area of 36.7 square miles (95.1 km^{2}), of which 35.4 square miles (91.8 km^{2}) are land and 1.2 square miles (3.2 km^{2}), or 3.40%, are water.

== Demographics ==
As of the census of 2000, there were 8,459 people, 2,882 households, and 2,466 families residing in the township. The population density was 237.3 inhabitants per square mile (91.6/km^{2}). There were 3,020 housing units at an average density of 84.7 per square mile (32.7/km^{2}). The racial makeup of the township was 97.81% White, 0.06% African American, 0.40% Native American, 0.61% Asian, 0.25% from other races, and 0.86% from two or more races. Hispanic or Latino of any race were 0.96% of the population.

There were 2,882 households, out of which 40.7% had children under the age of 18 living with them, 78.5% were married couples living together, 4.3% had a female householder with no husband present, and 14.4% were non-families. 11.7% of all households were made up of individuals, and 3.6% had someone living alone who was 65 years of age or older. The average household size was 2.93 and the average family size was 3.18.

In the township, the population was spread out, with 28.8% under the age of 18, 5.5% from 18 to 24, 28.7% from 25 to 44, 29.3% from 45 to 64, and 7.8% who were 65 years of age or older. The median age was 39 years. For every 100 females, there were 101.8 males. For every 100 females age 18 and over, there were 102.4 males.

The median income for a household in the township was $75,994, and the median income for a family was $82,307. Males had a median income of $60,760 versus $35,071 for females. The per capita income for the township was $29,292. About 3.7% of families and 4.2% of the population were below the poverty line, including 6.2% of those under age 18 and 2.1% of those age 65 or over.

== Government ==
The township is in the following electoral districts:

- State House District 47
- State Senate District 22
- US Congressional District 8
- County Commission districts 3 and 4

The township is within the following governmental service districts:

- Genesee District Library
- Cromaine District Library
- Fenton Area Public Schools
- Hartland Consolidated Schools
- Linden Community Schools
