= History of York City F.C. (1922–1980) =

History of an English football club

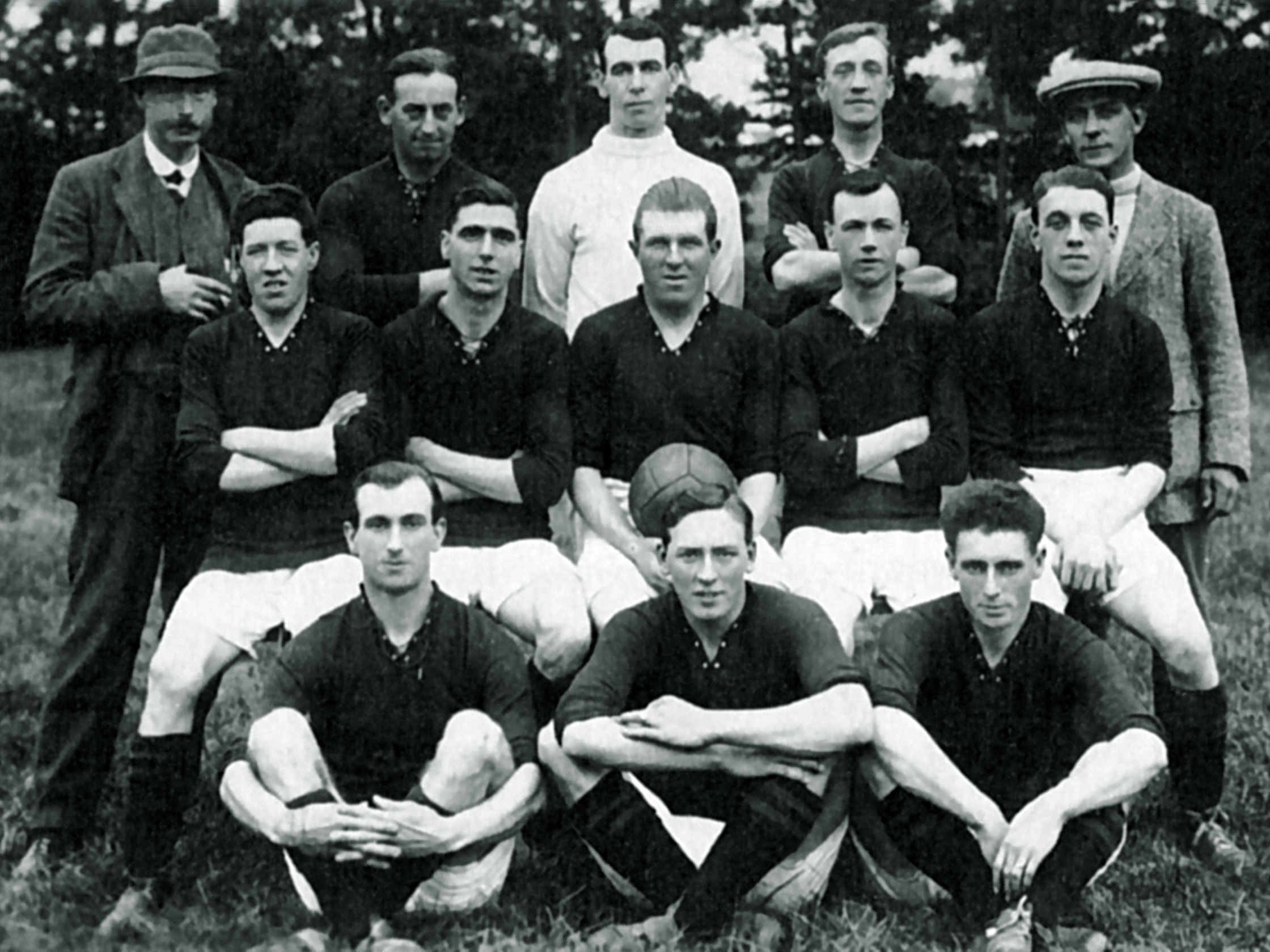
The York City squad before a match in 1922

York City Football Club is a professional association football club based in York, North Yorkshire, England. The history of York City F.C. from 1922 to 1980 covers the period from the club's foundation, through their progress in the Football League, to the end of the 1979–80 season.

Founded in 1922, York City was elected to play in the Midland League for 1922–23. After seven seasons in the Midland League, they were elected to play in the Football League for 1929–30, and were placed in the Third Division North. During the Second World War, York played in regional competitions, before the Football League restored its usual competitions in the 1946–47 season. After 14 seasons in the Football League, the club was required to apply for re-election for the first time because they finished the 1949–50 season at the bottom of the Third Division North. York had their best FA Cup season in the 1954–55 season, when they reached the semi-final; they were defeated by First Division team Newcastle United in a replay.

York played in the Third Division North until the 1958–59 season, when a league reorganisation placed them in the Fourth Division. The same season, they finished third and won their first promotion, but were relegated after one season. York won another promotion in the 1964–65 season, but were again relegated after one season. The club won a third promotion to the now-unified Third Division in the 1970–71 season, remaining there for the next two seasons on goal average. They were promoted to the Second Division for the first and only time in the 1973–74 season. By mid October 1974, York were in fifth place—their highest league placing—before finishing the 1974–75 season in 15th place. They faced two successive relegations in 1976 and 1977, and a 22nd-place finish in the 1977–78 Fourth Division forced the club to apply for re-election.

== 1922–1939: Foundation and establishment in Football League ==
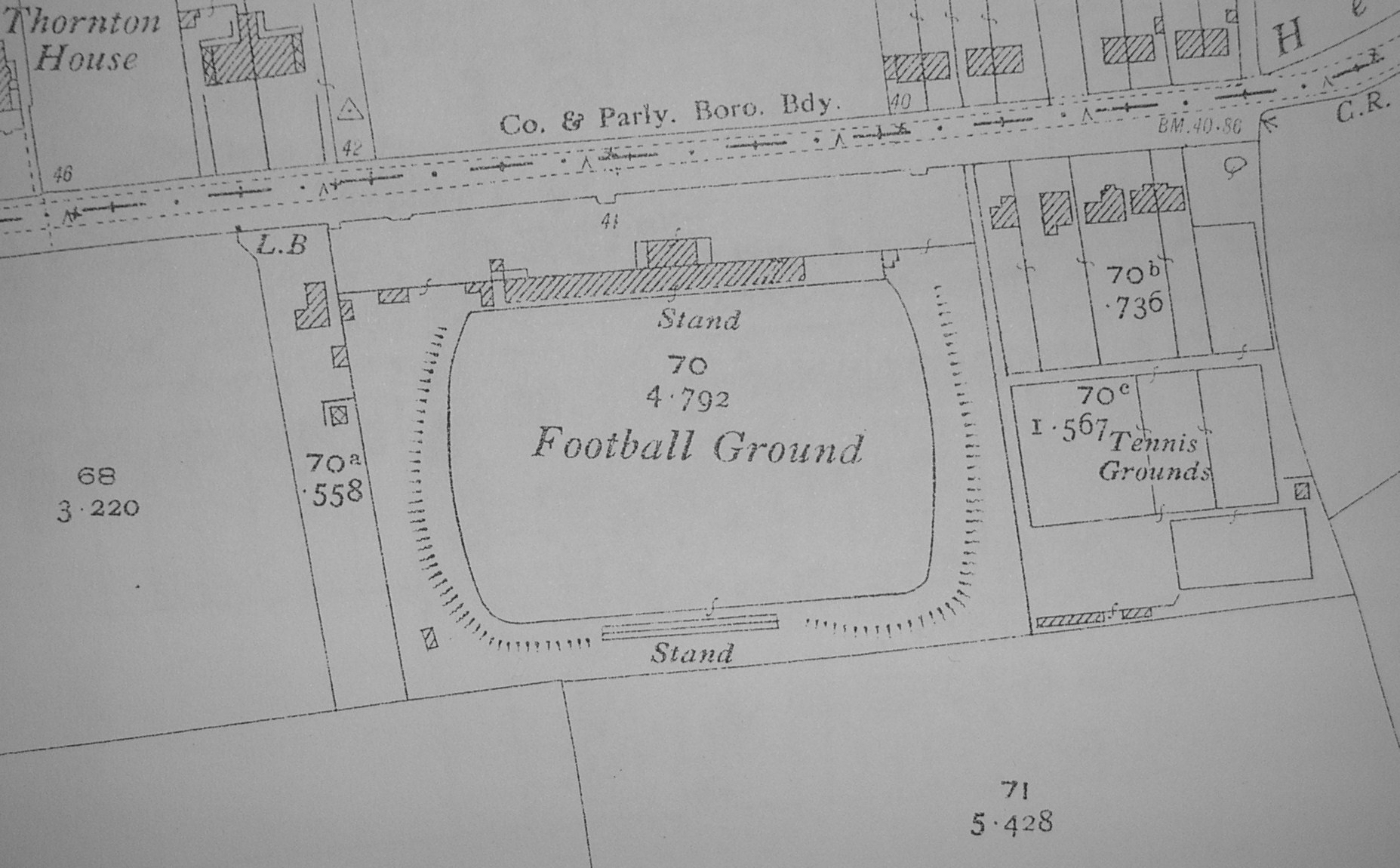
York played at Fulfordgate after the club's foundation in 1922.

As local football became more popular after the First World War, and with the success of the newly formed Yorkshire League, demand arose for a new club for the city of York, to succeed York City Football Club, which folded in 1917. At a meeting held at the Co-operative Hall in York on 6 May 1922, the decision was made to form the York City Association Football and Athletic Club Limited, with W. H. Shaw as chairman. Despite having neither a ground nor players, an application was made for election to the Football League; this was unsuccessful, but the club was admitted to the Midland League on 10 June. York's first match was away to Notts County reserves on 6 September, and despite a good performance the team lost 4–2. York had to play their first two home matches at Mille Crux, the ground of Rowntree & Co, because their Fulfordgate ground was not ready. Their first match at Fulfordgate came on 20 September, with a 4–1 victory against Mansfield Town. York finished the 1922–23 season in 19th place; they had been placed midtable in early March 1923 but failed to win any of their remaining 14 fixtures. In the same year, York reached the final of the North Riding Senior Cup, but lost 4–2 to Middlesbrough reserves at Ayresome Park on 10 March. The club's first season proved disappointing financially, with a loss of £718 reported, and as a consequence Shaw relinquished the chairmanship to Arthur Brown. York entered the FA Cup for the first time in the 1923–24 season and reached the first qualifying round, losing 3–1 to Mexborough Town in a second replay. They again ranked 19th in the table with an almost identical record to the previous season's.

For the 1924–25 season, the Midland League was reorganised because eight Football League clubs withdrew their reserve teams from the competition. York finished sixth in the Principal Competition that concluded in February 1925 and were runners-up to Denaby United in the North Subsidiary Competition. The club struggled financially in this period, and was only kept going by the enthusiasm and generosity of the directors. John Fisher, one of these benefactors, was elected chairman in 1925. The Midland League was restored to its previous size for 1925–26 and York finished in 16th place after a poor start to the season, from which they never recovered. York enjoyed their most successful Midland League season in 1926–27, when they finished in sixth place and scored 96 goals in 38 league matches. They surpassed the FA Cup's qualifying rounds for the first time this season, being beaten 2–1 by Second Division team Grimsby Town at Blundell Park in the second round. In 1927, the club made its first serious attempt for election to the Football League, but Barrow and Accrington Stanley were re-elected instead. Fisher resigned as chairman in August and Brown took the position for the second time. After ranking seventh in the Midland League in the 1927–28 season, York appointed their first official manager in July 1928, with Jock Collier named as player-manager. York finished ninth in the 1928–29 season, and Jimmy Cowie was the divisional top scorer with 49 goals. This was York's last season in the Midland League as the club won election to the Football League on 3 June 1929, taking the place of Ashington in the Third Division North.

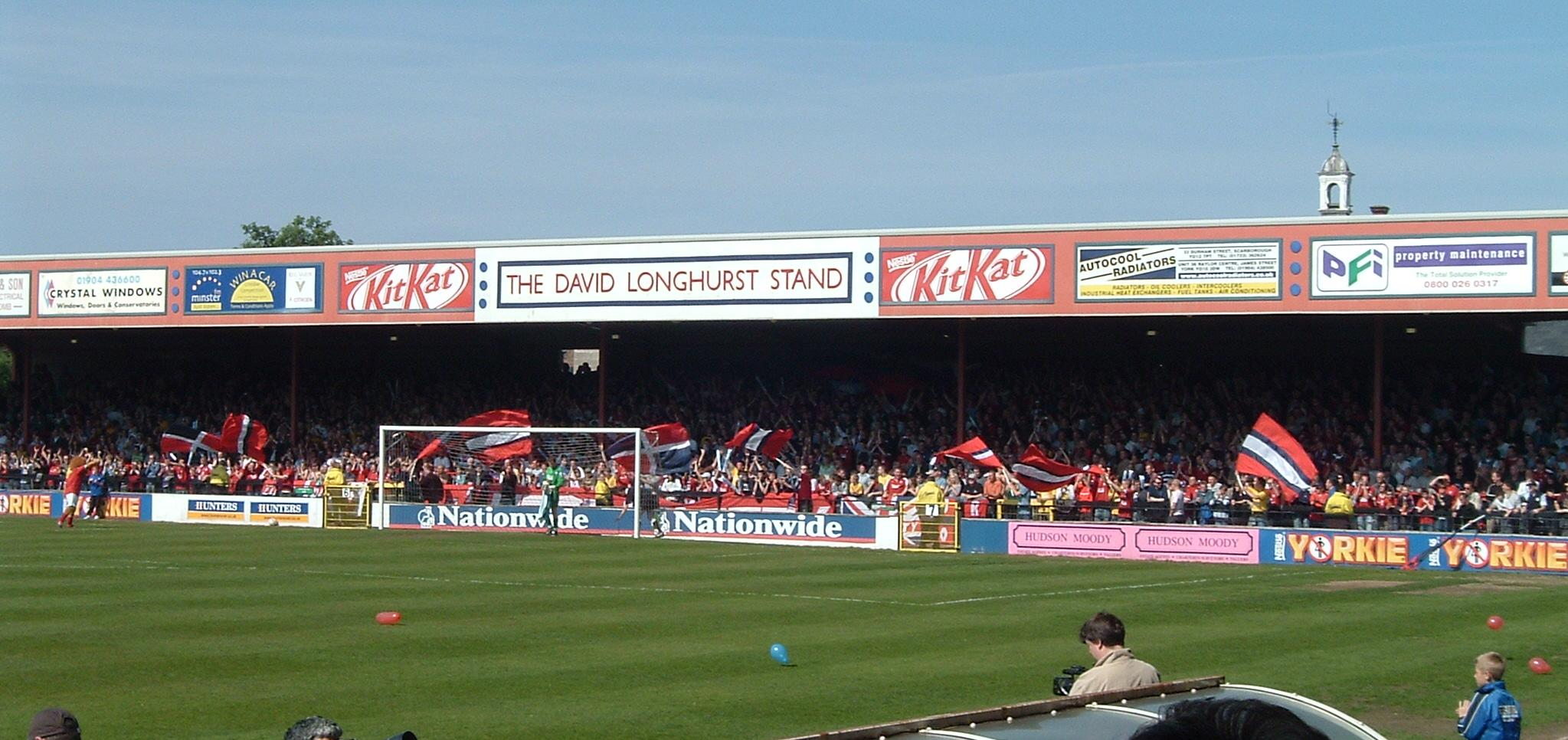
York moved to Bootham Crescent in 1932.

York's first match in the Football League was against Wigan Borough at Springfield Park on 31 August 1929 and finished with a 2–0 victory for the visitors. Reg Stockill, the scorer of the first goal, became the youngest player to represent the club in a competitive match at the age of 15 years and 281 days. The 1929–30 season brought two meetings with First Division team Newcastle United in the FA Cup third round, and a sixth-place finish in York's debut Football League season. Collier resigned as manager in May 1930 and Billy Sherrington took over for the following three years, combining this with his role as club secretary. Sherrington's first season in charge saw York rank 12th in the league, and they again faced First Division opposition in the FA Cup third round, taking Sheffield United to a replay. Despite an improved league position of ninth in the 1931–32 season, York were eliminated from the FA Cup in the first round. This, combined with disappointing average home crowds, resulted in a deficit of £1,539 over the season. In August 1932, York moved to a new ground at Bootham Crescent, which was closer than Fulfordgate to the club's centre of support and the railway station. The ground was officially opened for a match with Stockport County on 31 August; it ended a 2–2 draw, and the first goalscorer at the ground was Tom Mitchell. York's worst performance in the Football League to date came in the 1932–33 season, with a 20th-place finish. The club only avoided having to seek re-election after winning the last match of the season.

Collier was re-appointed manager in May 1933, and York enjoyed a better season in 1933–34, finishing 12th in the Third Division North. The club finished in 15th place in the 1934–35 season, and Bootham Crescent staged its first match against First Division opposition when Derby County defeated York 1–0 in the FA Cup third round. In 1935–36, York ranked in 16th place, and by the end of the season the club's debt was £7,048. The annual report stated that "increased support must be forthcoming if the club was to retain its Football League status". The team reached the FA Cup fourth round for the first time in the 1936–37 season, being eliminated by Second Division team Swansea Town in a replay. Collier retired from football in March 1937 to go into business with his brother, and was replaced by Tom Mitchell. The team finished an inconsistent season in 12th place. The 1937–38 season saw York placed "firmly on the football map", as the team eliminated First Division teams West Bromwich Albion and Middlesbrough from the FA Cup, before meeting Huddersfield Town in the sixth round. This match saw York draw 0–0 at home before a crowd of 28,123, the club's record highest attendance. York lost the replay 2–1 at Leeds Road, a match that attracted 58,066 spectators. By the end of that season's FA Cup run, York were on the fringe of the promotion race, but faltered in the closing weeks and finished in 11th place. The club avoided having to apply for re-election with a win in the penultimate match of the 1938–39 season, ranking 20th in the table. W. H. Sessions was appointed chairman to succeed Brown in 1939.

== 1939–1959: Wartime football, FA Cup run and first promotion ==
York's league positions since 1929–30

At the outbreak of the Second World War in September 1939, the Football League was suspended indefinitely, leaving the club with no revenue. The Football League organised regional competitions after the government gave the Football Association permission for football to proceed on a wartime footing. York decided to carry on playing and were placed in the North East League, where they ranked eighth in their section of 11 clubs. In the final weeks of the 1939–40 season, York competed in the Football League War Cup. The club was placed in the Football League North for the 1940–41 season, and finished 32nd in the 36-club league. They beat Sheffield Wednesday 7–0 in the War Cup, before being eliminated by Newcastle United in the second round. After completing 18 fixtures in the 1941–42 Football League North, York competed in the league-organised qualifying stage of the War Cup. They were eliminated after ranking 33rd of 54 clubs, failing to qualify for the knock-out stages by one place. York played in the Combined Counties Cup in the season's closing weeks, and beat Halifax Town 5–4 over two legs in the final.

After ranking 17th of 48 clubs in the Football League North in the 1942–43 season, York progressed through the War Cup qualifying stages, reaching the semi-final of a major cup competition for the first time. They were beaten 4–1 over two legs by Sheffield Wednesday. In the 1943–44 Football League North, the team finished 31st of 50 clubs, and after qualifying for the War Cup knock-out stages were eliminated 7–2 over two legs by Bradford Park Avenue in the second round. York experienced selection problems in the 1944–45 season, with many players leaving for war service. After ranking 42nd of 54 clubs in the Football League North, they then failed to qualify for the War Cup knock-out stages. They extended their programme by competing in the Tyne, Wear and Tees Cup. Although hostilities had finished by the start of the 1945–46 season, there was insufficient time for the Football League to restore its usual competitions. York finished midtable in the Third Division North (East) in the first half of the season, before reaching the second round of the Third Division North (East) Cup after qualifying through the group stages. The FA Cup resumed this season, and for the first and only time ties were played on a two-legged basis. York reached the fourth round, at which point they were beaten 11–1 on aggregate by Sheffield Wednesday. York made a profit in five of the seven seasons played during the war.

Peacetime football resumed in the 1946–47 season, with the same fixture list as the abandoned 1939–40 season. York endured a midseason run of 10 defeats from 11 matches, before their form improved, and 5 wins from the last 8 matches saw them finish in 15th place in the Third Division North. They were top of the table by mid September 1947, before a run of 2 wins from 13 matches saw them drop to 18th place. York finished the 1947–48 season in 13th place, and the club recorded a net profit of £4,914; a balance surplus of £1,843 was carried forward. In September 1948, York purchased their Bootham Crescent ground, which had been leased since 1932, for £4,075. They achieved their record average league attendance of 10,412 during the 1948–49 season at the peak of the post-war attendance boom. The team enjoyed a run of eight successive league wins at home spanning September 1948 to January 1949, but failed to win any of their last seven fixtures to finish 1948–49 in 14th place.

Mitchell resigned as manager in February 1950 and was replaced in April with Dick Duckworth, a former York player. York were forced to apply for re-election to retain their place in the Football League for the first time, after finishing bottom of the Third Division North in the 1949–50 season. They did not have to enter the ballot because the Football League was to be extended to 92 clubs for the 1950–51 season. Despite York's senior team's troubles, the reserve team scored over 100 goals to finish sixth in the Midland League, and won the North Riding Senior Cup for the first time after beating Middlesbrough 3–0 at Ayresome Park in the final. York's fortunes improved in 1950–51; they ranked 17th in the league and reached the FA Cup third round for the first time since 1946, when they were beaten 2–0 by First Division team Bolton Wanderers at Burnden Park. York's best post-war season to date came in 1951–52, as they finished in 10th place and set a home record of 16 wins, 4 draws and 3 defeats. York chased promotion in the 1952–53 season, and by late January 1953 were third in the table. They finished in fourth place with 53 points; both new club records in the Football League. During this season, Duckworth was reluctantly released from his contract in October 1952 to take charge at Stockport County. His successor, the former Grimsby Town manager Charlie Spencer, died in February. Sheffield United's assistant manager Jimmy McCormick was appointed in June, and by late December York were bottom of the table. A win in the last match of the 1953–54 season meant they finished in 22nd place, and avoided having to apply for re-election. Sessions resigned as chairman in November and was succeeded by Hugh Kitchin.

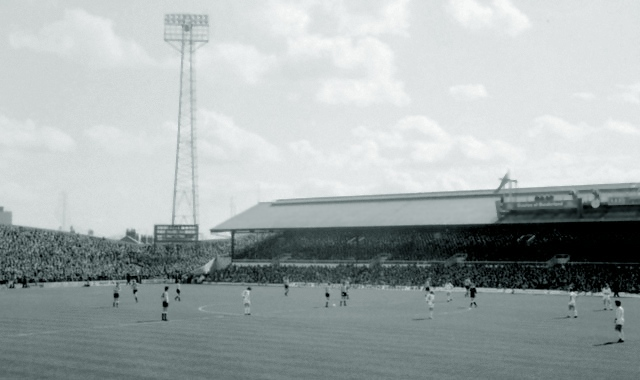
York's FA Cup semi-final replay with Newcastle United was played at Roker Park.

After a dispute with the directors over team selection, McCormick resigned in September 1954, after which team affairs were handled by trainer Tom Lockie and secretary Billy Sherrington. With an emphasis on close-passing attacking football, the team embarked on a 10-match unbeaten sequence. In the 1954–55 FA Cup, York became the first third-tier club to participate in an FA Cup semi-final replay. York beat Scarborough, Dorchester Town, Blackpool (winners of the competition 18 months earlier), Bishop Auckland, Tottenham Hotspur and Notts County in the previous rounds before playing Newcastle United in the semi-final. After drawing 1–1 at Hillsborough, York were defeated 2–0 in the replay at Roker Park, which ended an FA Cup campaign in which Arthur Bottom scored eight goals. The team were billed "The Happy Wanderers" after a popular song; Henry Rose of the Daily Express said, "There are no weak spots in this First Division side masquerading in Third Division shirts". By the end of the cup run, York were on the fringes of the Third Division North promotion race, but injuries and a congested fixture list led to them finishing fourth in the 1954–55 season. Bottom was the divisional top scorer that season, with 31 goals.

York were optimistic for the 1955–56 season, and were top of the table after 10 matches. A run of nine consecutive matches without a win saw York drop out of promotion contention, and they finished 11th. That season's FA Cup run included a 2–1 win over a Swansea Town team featuring eight Wales internationals at Vetch Field in the third round. They then played First Division team Sunderland, billed as the "Bank of England club" because of their high expenditure on transfers, York were beaten 2–1 at Roker Park in a replay. During this season, York filled the managerial position that had been vacant for the last 18 months; Arsenal player Don Roper rejected the job before Sam Bartram was appointed in March 1956. Bartram, a former Charlton Athletic player, was a popular choice, having been a favourite with the fans while playing for the club during the war. York invested heavily in the squad for the 1956–57 season, spending £12,000 on transfer fees—a sizeable amount at that time. The aim was promotion to the Second Division, but the team failed to make the intended impact and finished in seventh place. The 1957–58 season was the last of regionalised football; the top 12 clubs in the North and South sections would form the new Third Division, and the bottom clubs would become founder members of the Fourth Division. York went into the Easter period third from bottom, but after 7 wins and 3 draws in their last 10 matches they missed out on a top-12 position on goal average. York led the Fourth Division until early November 1958, and despite faltering midseason continued strongly to finish third in 1958–59 and gain promotion for the first time. They only missed out on the runner-up spot to Coventry City on goal average.

== 1959–1980: Promotions, relegations and spell in Second Division ==
Club crest during the 1960s and 1970s

By late February 1960, York were 12th in the Third Division. After one season, in which the team won only 2 of their last 14 matches, they were relegated from the Third Division in 21st place. Bartram was released from his contract in July and was replaced by Lockie. His team started the 1960–61 season well, and were fourth by mid November. York endured five successive defeats before a winning run in the New Year revived their promotion hopes. They finished the season in fifth place, having won only one of their last seven matches. Throughout the 1961–62 season, York were in or around the top four places, but missed out on promotion after losing 1–0 to Aldershot in the last match, finishing in sixth place. That season, York enjoyed their best run in the newly instituted League Cup. In this competition, they beat First Division team Leicester City, but were eliminated after a 2–1 defeat to divisional rivals Rochdale at Spotland Stadium in the fifth round. York made a poor start to the 1962–63 season and were second from bottom by late December 1962. Their form improved from March 1963 and they finished the season 14th. Club historian David Batters described the 1963–64 season as "one of the worst in the club's history". York spent most of the season in the bottom four before finishing 22nd, having to apply for re-election for the second time. This application was successful, as the club polled the maximum 48 votes. During this season, a match-fixing scandal exposed by the newspaper Sunday People accused York player Jack Fountain of fixing match results. His contract was terminated and he was found guilty of fixing two matches York lost.

York produced some of their best football in a decade in the 1964–65 season, winning 20 league matches at home—a club record—and ending the season in third place to gain promotion, one point behind champions Brighton & Hove Albion. The following season, they were in the bottom four by late December 1965. They finished the season in bottom place and were relegated back to the Fourth Division, having conceded a club-record 106 goals. After the season ended, York released Norman Wilkinson, who had scored a club-record 143 goals. York struggled throughout the 1966–67 season and finished 22nd after a club-record eight successive defeats. The club was forced into its third re-election bid, which was successful with 45 votes. Kitchin resigned the chairmanship in June 1967 and was succeeded by Derrick Blundy, who held the position for 16 months, after which Eric Magson took over. York started the 1967–68 season winning none of their first 13 matches. Their first win came in late October, by which time Lockie had become the first manager to be dismissed by the club. Former Sheffield United player Joe Shaw took charge in November, and York rose from bottom place to 14th by late March 1968. However, they won none of their last eight matches and finished 21st. Another application for re-election was made, which was successful with 46 votes. Shaw resigned for personal reasons a week into the 1968–69 season, and former Huddersfield Town manager Tom Johnston succeeded him in October. Poor away form led to York finishing 21st, and the club's application for re-election was successful with 45 votes. The team reached the FA Cup third round, and were beaten 2–0 at home by First Division team Stoke City.

York were fourth in the table 12 matches into the 1969–70 season. Their promotion challenge faded and they finished the season 13th. York reached the fourth round of the FA Cup for the first time since 1958, and played two Second Division teams; after beating Cardiff City 3–1 at St Andrew's in a second replay, they lost 4–1 to Middlesbrough at Ayresome Park. Barry Jackson, who made a club-record 539 appearances for York, was released at the end of the season. York started 1970–71 strongly, and after faltering midseason they went unbeaten in 16 consecutive matches to enter the top four. Despite losing three of their last four fixtures, York remained in fourth place to earn a third promotion. They also reached the FA Cup fourth round for the second successive season; after drawing 3–3 at home to First Division team Southampton they were beaten 3–2 in the replay at the Dell. York started the 1971–72 season with 3 wins from 8 matches, but after failing to win in 11 consecutive matches they dropped into the bottom four. They finished 19th on goal average and avoided relegation. In the third round of the League Cup, York played First Division team Sheffield United, losing 3–1 at Bramall Lane. York failed to win any of their first 11 matches in the 1972–73 season, but results improved and they were 10th in the table by early March 1973. Another downturn in form followed before York beat Rotherham United in the last match of the season to finish 18th, avoiding relegation from the Third Division on goal average for the second successive year.

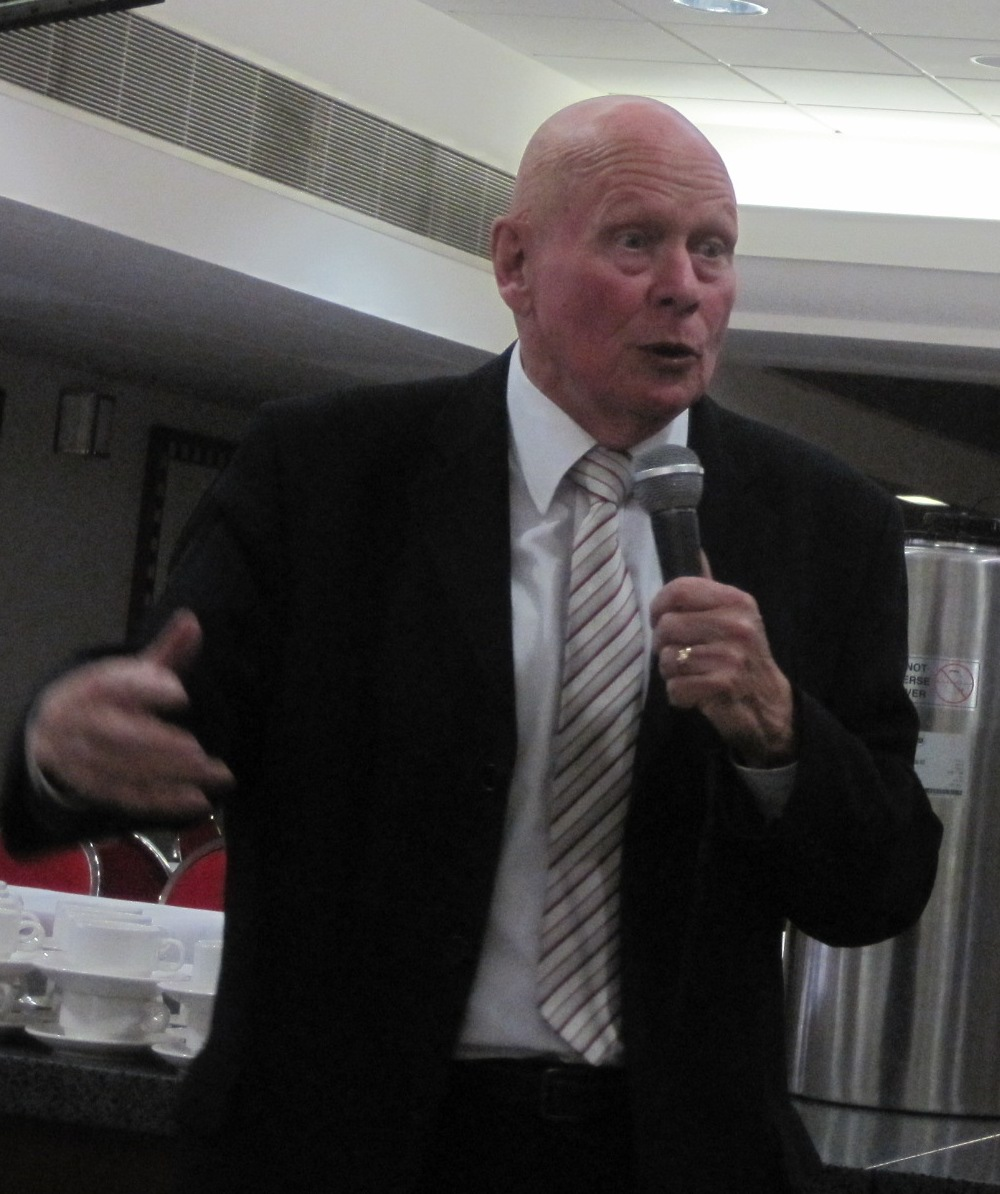
York endured successive relegations from the Second Division to the Fourth Division under Wilf McGuinness.

From mid November 1973, York remained within the top three in 1973–74, winning promotion to the Second Division for the first time, in the season "three up, three down" was introduced in the top three divisions. Promotion was secured after a 1–1 home draw against Oldham Athletic on 27 April 1974. This season, York held First Division team Manchester City to a 0–0 home draw in the League Cup fourth round, before being beaten 4–1 in the replay at Maine Road. In January, Bob Strachan became chairman and served on the FA Council, the first York official to do so. The team drew 1–1 at home with Aston Villa in their opening Second Division match on 17 August, with Barry Lyons the York goalscorer. After starting the 1974–75 season well, York were fifth in the table by mid October—the club's highest-ever placing in the Football League. York finished in 15th place, and the season's highlights included doubles over Norwich City—who won promotion—and Fulham—who were FA Cup finalists that season. York were exempt from the FA Cup until the third round, where they drew 1–1 with First Division team Arsenal at Highbury; in the replay, Arsenal won 3–1 after extra time at York. Johnston left to take over at Huddersfield Town in January 1975, and was succeeded in February by former Manchester United manager Wilf McGuinness. York started the 1975–76 season with 2 wins from 8 fixtures, but a run of 10 defeats from 11 matches saw them drop into the bottom two. Seven successive defeats in the New Year saw York drop to bottom place, although results improved in the season's closing weeks. They were relegated to the Third Division in 21st place, after a 2–2 home draw with Chelsea on 24 April 1976. They lost their League Cup second round match 1–0 at home to First Division team Liverpool.

York started 1976–77 poorly, and they were in the bottom two of the Third Division for most of the first half of the season. The midseason signings Chris Galvin and Gordon Staniforth marked an improvement in results, but after winning only 1 of their last 15 matches they finished in bottom place and were relegated for the second successive season. The 1977–78 season also started poorly; York lost 7 of their opening 12 matches, leaving them 17th in the table. McGuinness was dismissed in October 1977 and was succeeded the following month by Charlie Wright, a former Charlton Athletic player. York remained in the lower reaches of the table and finished the season in 22nd place, forcing the club to apply for re-election for the sixth time. This was successful, as the club polled the maximum number of votes. This season, attendances fell to an all-time low, and amid growing financial trouble, Michael Sinclair took over as chairman in April 1978 in a boardroom shuffle. Results improved in the 1978–79 season; York finished 10th in the Fourth Division and reached the FA Cup fourth round. They played reigning First Division champions and European Cup winners-elect Nottingham Forest, and were beaten 3–1 at the City Ground. In the 1979–80 season, York were consistently in the lower reaches of the table, before finishing 17th. With the club 18th in the table by mid March 1980, Wright was dismissed. Youth coach Barry Lyons succeeded him, initially as caretaker manager, before being appointed permanently in May.
