= List of York City F.C. managers =

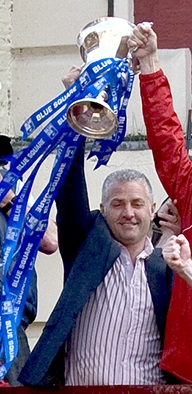
Gary Mills oversaw York City's promotion to League Two in the 2011–12 season.

York City Football Club is a professional association football club based in York, North Yorkshire, England. This chronological list comprises all those who have held the position of manager of the first team of York City. Each manager's entry includes his dates of tenure and the club's overall competitive record (in terms of matches won, drawn and lost), honours won and significant achievements while under his care. Caretaker managers are included, where known, as well as those who have been in permanent charge.

== History ==
=== 1922–1967 ===
York City went without an official manager from their formation in May 1922 until the appointment of Jock Collier in July 1928. Collier initially joined as player-manager, but was forced to retire from playing due to a broken ankle after two matches. He was in charge for York's last season in the Midland League before their election to the Football League in June 1929. Collier oversaw the club's successful transition from non-League football to the Third Division North, but left the club in May 1930 to become a publican. Billy Sherrington combined his duties as club secretary with that of manager for the next three years, before Collier was reappointed manager in May 1933. With results at a low ebb, he helped York establish themselves in the Football League, and led them to the fourth round of the 1936–37 FA Cup. In March 1937, Collier retired from football to go into business with his brother. Former player Tom Mitchell was appointed, and in his first full season led York to the quarter-final of the 1937–38 FA Cup.

League football was suspended in September 1939 with the outbreak of the Second World War, and team affairs in wartime competitions were handled by director and acting manager Arthur Wright, before his resignation from illness midway through the 1942–43 season. He was replaced by Tom Lockie, who carried on until after the 1945–46 FA Cup, when Mitchell returned for the 1946–47 Football League season. Mitchell resigned in February 1950 to concentrate on his business interests, and was succeeded in April by Birmingham City northern scout and former York player Dick Duckworth. He lifted the club from the bottom of the table to a top four position, but left in October 1952 to take over at Stockport County. Former Grimsby Town manager Charlie Spencer took over in November 1952, but his health declined and died in February 1953, after less than three months in charge. Sheffield United assistant manager Jimmy McCormick was appointed in June 1953, before he resigned in September 1954 over a dispute with the board regarding team selection. York went the next 18 months without an official manager, with team matters handled by trainer Lockie and secretary Sherrington. This was a successful period for the club; York reached the semi-final of the 1954–55 FA Cup, and were beaten by Newcastle United in a replay.

Sam Bartram, a former Charlton Athletic player who played for York during the war, was appointed manager in March 1956. Under him York narrowly missed out on becoming founder members of the Fourth Division on goal average in 1957–58, although the club's first promotion came the following season with a third-place finish. York were relegated from the Third Division after one season, and Bartram left in July 1960 to take over at Luton Town. Lockie was his successor, and in his first two seasons as manager York narrowly missed out on promotion. This was followed by two disappointing seasons, including an application for re-election after 1963–64, before York won promotion to the Third Division in 1964–65 by playing exciting and attacking football. Immediate relegation followed, and York had to apply for re-election again after 1966–67. Lockie became the first York manager to be dismissed in October 1967, with the team bottom of the Fourth Division.

=== 1967–1991 ===
Former Sheffield United player Joe Shaw was appointed in November 1967, but he could not prevent York having to seek re-election after 1967–68. Shaw resigned for personal reasons in August 1968, and was succeeded by former Huddersfield Town manager Tom Johnston in October. Another re-election bid came after 1968–69, but Johnston gradually improved the team; after a midtable finish the following season, York were promoted to the Third Division in 1970–71. York avoided relegation on goal average over the next two seasons, before winning promotion to the Second Division in 1973–74 with a third-place finish. Johnston resigned to return to Huddersfield Town in January 1975; club historian David Batters described him as "arguably the most successful manager in York City's history".

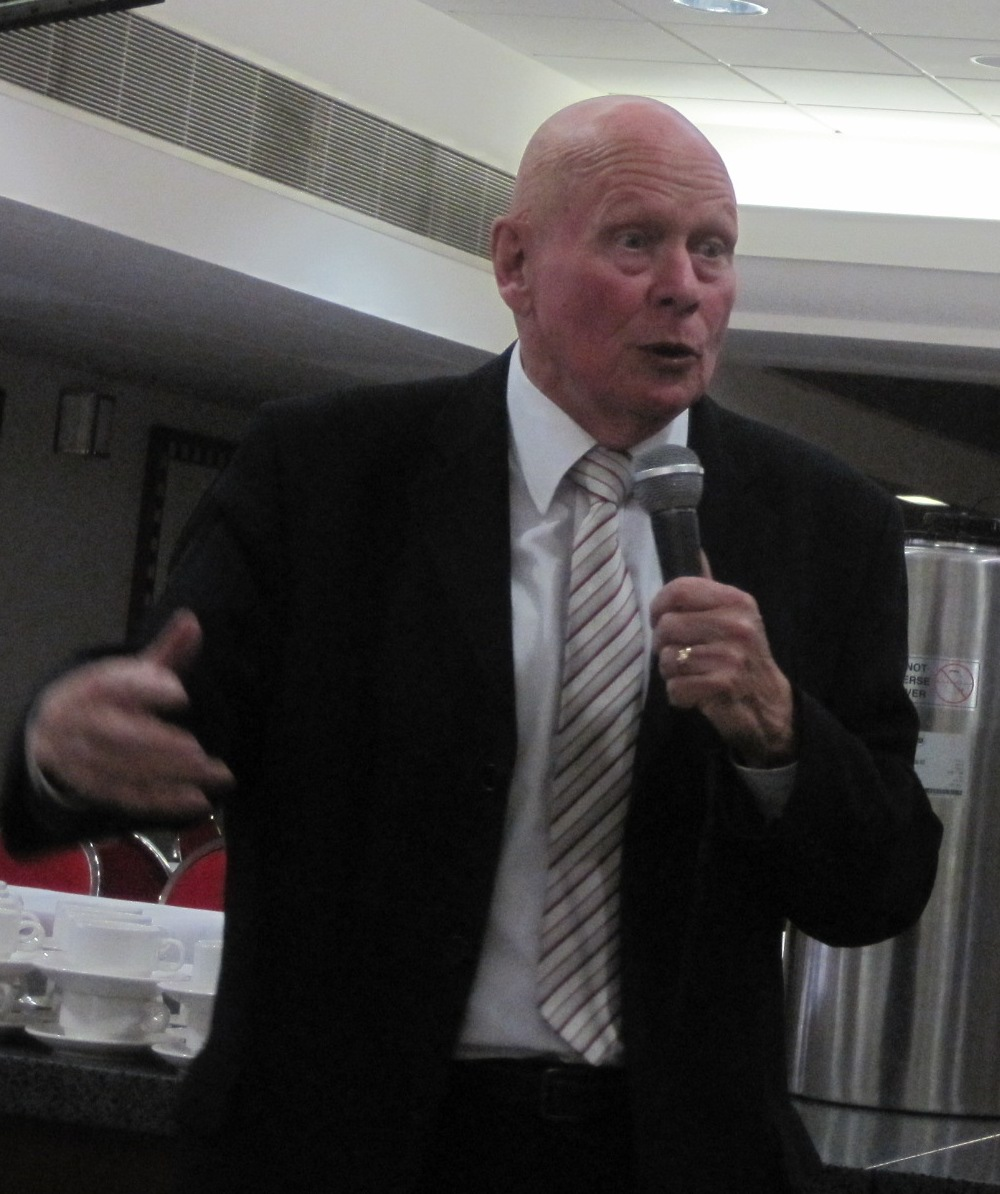
York were relegated from the Second Division to the Fourth Division in successive seasons under Wilf McGuinness.

York appointed former Manchester United manager Wilf McGuinness in February 1975, and he helped them stay in the Second Division in 1974–75. However, York faced successive relegations under McGuinness, when finishing 21st in 1975–76 and bottom of the Third Division in 1976–77. He was dismissed in October 1977, with York 22nd in the Fourth Division, and was succeeded by former Charlton Athletic player Charlie Wright in November. He could not prevent a re-election bid after 1977–78, before leading York to 10th place the following season. Wright was dismissed in March 1980 with the team near the bottom of the table, and under caretaker manager Barry Lyons York finished 17th in 1979–80. He was appointed permanently in May 1980, and York finished bottom of the table in his first full season in charge. York continued to struggle and Lyons was dismissed in December 1981; Kevin Randall and Barry Swallow each had spells in caretaker charge, before York finished 17th in 1981–82.

Denis Smith, who played on loan from Stoke City the previous season, was appointed player-manager in May 1982. After leading York to seventh place in 1982–83, Smith retired from playing. York won their first major title in 1983–84, when the Fourth Division championship was secured with 101 points. This meant York became the first team to achieve a three-figure points total in a Football League season. In the next two seasons they finished eighth and seventh in the Third Division, and took Liverpool to FA Cup fifth round replays. York narrowly avoided relegation in 1986–87, and Smith left to take over at Sunderland in May 1987. Former Blackburn Rovers manager Bobby Saxton was appointed in June 1987; he was tasked with rebuilding the team in a matter of weeks, and York were relegated to the Fourth Division in 1987–88. With York bottom of the table, Saxton resigned in September 1988, and was succeeded by former Hartlepool United manager John Bird in October. York ranked 11th in 1988–89, and having looked like mounting a promotion challenge, finished 13th the following season. York were bottom of the Fourth Division by the time of Bird's dismissal in October 1991.

=== 1991–2010 ===
York appointed Aston Villa assistant manager John Ward in November 1991. Ward developed the team he inherited from Bird, and York were top of the table by December 1992. He left for Bristol Rovers in March 1993, and was succeeded by his assistant Alan Little. Two months later Little led York to promotion via the Third Division play-offs, with a penalty shoot-out victory over Crewe Alexandra in the final. In the 1993–94 season, York were beaten by Stockport County in the semi-final of the Second Division play-offs. York finished midtable the following season, but only avoided relegation in 1995–96 with a win on the final day of the season, although they knocked Manchester United out of the 1995–96 League Cup. In the following season's competition they eliminated Everton, but again narrowly avoided relegation that season. York's form continued to falter by the late 1990s, and Little was dismissed in March 1999 after a run of 10 matches without a win.

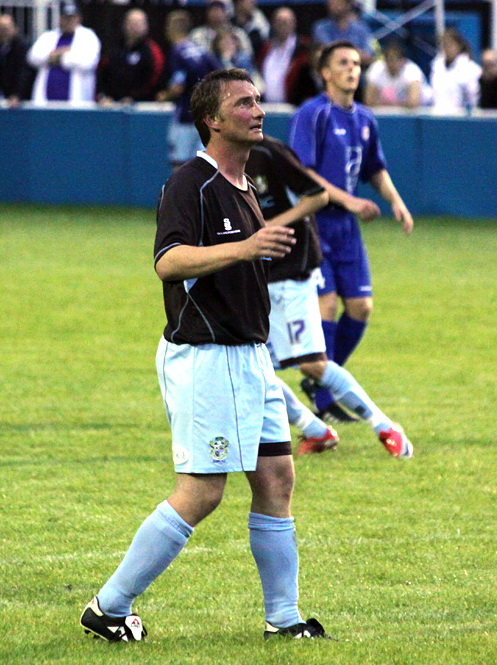
York were relegated to the Conference National under Chris Brass in 2003–04.

York player Neil Thompson took over as caretaker manager, but he was unable to avoid relegation to the Third Division, after a defeat on the last day of 1998–99. He was appointed permanently in May 1999, but was dismissed in February 2000 with York 21st in the table. Former Hull City manager Terry Dolan was appointed and he led York clear of relegation in 1999–2000. Despite off-pitch problems at the club, York were in an automatic promotion place by late March 2003, before finishing 10th in 2002–03. York player Chris Brass was appointed player-manager in June 2003; aged 27, this made him the youngest managerial appointment in the Football League since 1946. Having been 10th in the table in January 2004, York went 20 matches without a win and were relegated to the Conference National after 2003–04, which brought to an end 75 years of Football League membership. Brass was dismissed in November 2004 with York fourth from bottom of the table, and his assistant Viv Busby took caretaker charge before the appointment of former Derby County coach Billy McEwan in February 2005.

McEwan steered York away from relegation with a 17th-place finish in 2004–05, and his rebuilt team finished eighth the following season. York reached the play-offs in 2006–07, but were beaten 1–0 on aggregate by Morecambe in the semi-final. With home form poor McEwan was dismissed in November 2007, and his assistant Colin Walker took over as caretaker manager before being appointed permanently in December. After only five wins from the first 19 matches of 2008–09, Walker was dismissed in November 2008, and was succeeded by former Port Vale manager Martin Foyle. York avoided relegation in the penultimate match of the season and reached the 2009 FA Trophy final, in which they were beaten by Stevenage Borough. Foyle's York lost to Oxford United in the 2010 Conference Premier play-off final, and he resigned in September 2010 with the team 15th in the table 10 matches into 2010–11.

=== 2010–2022 ===
Tamworth manager Gary Mills was appointed in October 2010, and he led York to sixth place in 2010–11. In his first full season in charge, Mills led York to victory in the 2012 FA Trophy final over Newport County, and subsequently in the 2012 Conference Premier play-off final over Luton Town. By winning the play-offs, York were promoted to League Two, meaning the club returned to the Football League after an eight-year absence. Mills was dismissed in March 2013 after a run of 11 matches without a win left York in 18th place. Former Northern Ireland manager Nigel Worthington guided York away from relegation with four wins from the last five matches of 2012–13. Worthington led York to the League Two play-offs in 2013–14, and they were beaten 1–0 on aggregate in the semi-final by Fleetwood Town. With only one win from his last 17 matches in charge, Worthington resigned in October 2014. Former Scunthorpe United manager Russ Wilcox was appointed, and York avoided relegation after a run of four wins from five matches late into 2014–15.

Wilcox was dismissed in October 2015 after a nine-match run without a win left York 21st in the table, and was succeeded by the former Dundee United manager Jackie McNamara in November. York went on a run of one win from the last 16 fixtures, and were relegated to the National League after finishing bottom of League Two in 2015–16. This marked the end of York's four-year return in the Football League. With the team 19th in the National League, Gary Mills was reappointed manager in October 2016, shortly after he was dismissed by Wrexham. McNamara remained at the club after taking on the role of chief executive. Mills was unable to stop York being relegated to the National League North for the first time in 2016–17, although they did beat Macclesfield Town in the 2017 FA Trophy final. Mills was dismissed in September 2017, with York seventh in the National League North and 11 points away from the only automatic promotion place. He was succeeded by Darlington manager Martin Gray, who led York to an 11th-place finish in 2017–18. He left in August 2018 when his contract was not renewed, with the team eighth in the table after five matches.

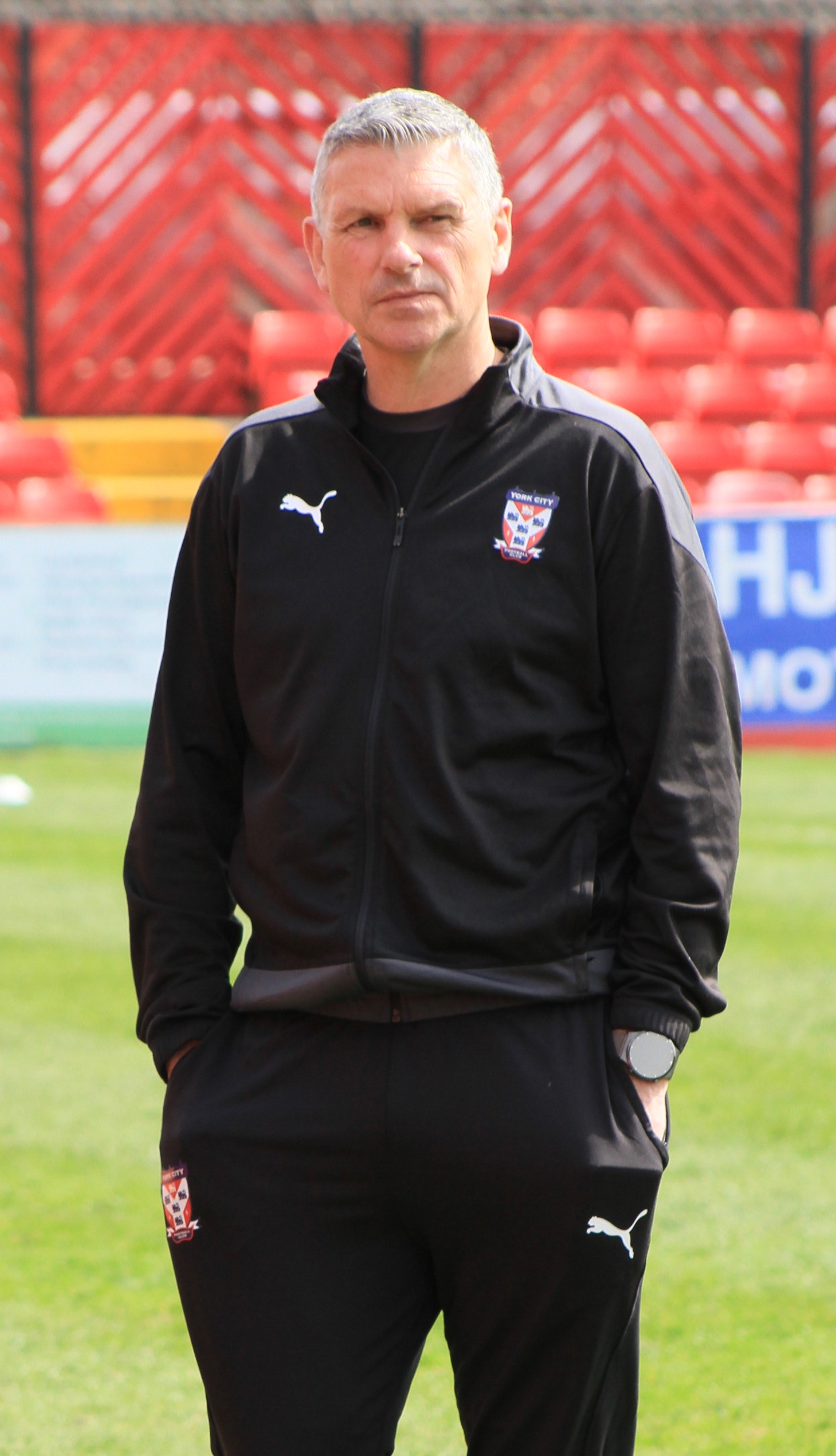
John Askey led York to promotion to the National League via the 2022 National League North play-offs

Sam Collins was appointed in October 2018 after four wins from eight matches as caretaker manager before being dismissed in January 2019 with the team 15th in the table. He was succeeded by Gateshead's Steve Watson, and under him York finished in 12th place in 2018–19. The next two seasons were disrupted by the COVID-19 pandemic, with York being beaten by Altrincham in the play-off semi-final after the 2019–20 final league table was decided on an unweighted points per game basis, before 2020–21 was declared null and void. Watson left in November 2021 with York in a midtable position, and former Port Vale manager John Askey took over as interim manager. He was appointed permanently in March 2022 after results improved, including a run of 12 matches without defeat. Askey led York to promotion back to the National League after a five-year absence at the end of the 2021–22 season, after the team beat Boston United 2–0 in the 2022 National League North play-off final.

=== 2022–present ===
Askey was dismissed in November 2022 with the team 12th in the National League after 19 matches, which was described as a "shock" decision by The Press due to Askey's successful record as manager and popular standing with supporters. David Webb was appointed in December to his first managerial role, having previously held youth football and off-field positions, and was most recently head of football operations at Huddersfield Town. He was dismissed in February 2023 with York four points above the relegation zone following four successive defeats. At two months, his tenure was the shortest of any permanent manager at the club. Webb's assistant, Michael Morton, took over as interim manager, and was appointed permanently in May after leading York to a 19th-place finish in the 2022–23 season. Morton was dismissed in August after six matches without a win at the start of the 2023–24 season left York second from bottom of the table. He was succeeded in September by former Solihull Moors manager Neal Ardley, who was replaced in February 2024 by Worthing manager Adam Hinshelwood, with the team one point above the relegation zone in 20th place. Hinshelwood guided York to safety from relegation on the final day of the 2023–24 season, finishing in 20th place. His team finished in second place in the 2024–25 National League with 96 points—the second highest seasonal points tally in the club's history—but were eliminated from the play-offs after losing 3–0 at home to Oldham Athletic in the semi-final. Hinshelwood was dismissed in August 2025 after only four matches of the 2025–26 season had been played, with the decision described in The Press as "something as a shock to supporters".

Hinshelwood was replaced in August 2025 by former Notts County manager Stuart Maynard, who led York to a club record 24 successive league matches unbeaten, which spanned October 2025 to February 2026, as well as another record of nine successive league matches won. The team maintained a race with Rochdale for the 2025–26 National League title, which went down to the final day of the season and saw York play Rochdale away, needing only a draw to secure the title. Rochdale opened the scoring in the fifth minute of stoppage time, before York equalised eight minutes later to secure the title with a 1–1 draw. As a result, York were promoted to League Two, returning to the Football League after an absence of ten years. Maynard was dismissed only three months later in July 2026, with the club citing a "difference in direction and vision", and was replaced by former Crawley Town manager Scott Lindsey, who was appointed to the position of head coach.

== Key ==
- All first-team matches in national competition are counted, except the abandoned 1939–40 Football League season and matches in wartime leagues and cups.
- Names of caretaker (or interim) managers are supplied where known, and periods of caretaker-management are highlighted in italics and marked †. Win percentage is rounded to one decimal place.
- P = matches played; W = matches won; D = matches drawn; L = matches lost; Win % = win percentage
- Statistics are complete up to and including the match played on 21 November 2026.

== Managers ==
Table of managers, including tenure, record and honours
Name	From	To	Record					Honours	Notes	Ref.
Name	From	To	P	W	D	L	Win %	Honours	Notes	Ref.
Jock Collier	14 July 1928	May 1930	105	44	33	28	41.9		(Note: Formerly played for the club.)	
Billy Sherrington	May 1930	2 May 1933	130	50	21	59	38.5			
Jock Collier	2 May 1933	16 March 1937	178	63	39	76	35.4			
Tom Mitchell	16 March 1937	23 February 1950	270	91	64	115	33.7		(Note: Director Arthur Wright was York's acting manager in wartime competitions after the outbreak of the Second World War until his resignation midway through the 1942–43 season. He was replaced by Tom Lockie, who managed York's matches in the 1945–46 FA Cup, before Tom Mitchell resumed as manager for the 1946–47 Football League season.)	
Dick Duckworth	3 April 1950	22 October 1952	120	40	38	42	33.3		(Note: Duckworth's appointment was announced 20 March 1950 but did not take effect until 3 April.)	
Charlie Spencer	17 November 1952	9 February 1953	12	4	3	5	33.3		(Note: Spencer's appointment was announced on 15 November 1952 but did not take effect until 17 November.)	
Jimmy McCormick	1 June 1953	7 September 1954	53	14	14	25	26.4		(Note: McCormick's appointment was announced on 13 May 1953 but did not take effect until 1 June.)	
Sam Bartram	12 March 1956	19 July 1960	209	84	56	69	40.2	Fourth Division promotion: 1958–59		
Tom Lockie	July 1960	16 October 1967	376	134	82	160	35.6	Fourth Division promotion: 1964–65		
Joe Shaw	6 November 1967	16 August 1968	33	9	9	15	27.3			
Tom Johnston	31 October 1968	11 January 1975	329	121	94	114	36.8	Fourth Division promotion: 1970–71; Third Division promotion: 1973–74		
Clive Baker †	11 January 1975	15 February 1975	4	2	1	1	50.0			
Wilf McGuinness	15 February 1975	20 October 1977	129	31	32	66	24.0			
John Simpson †	20 October 1977	22 November 1977	5	2	1	2	40.0			
Charlie Wright	22 November 1977	18 March 1980	124	40	30	54	32.3			
Barry Lyons	18 March 1980	8 December 1981	82	24	18	40	29.3			
Kevin Randall †	8 December 1981	3 March 1982	11	1	3	7	9.1			
Barry Swallow †	3 March 1982	15 May 1982	19	8	2	9	42.1			
Denis Smith	May 1982	31 May 1987	279	128	64	87	45.9	Fourth Division championship: 1983–84	(Note: Smith's appointment was announced on 12 May 1982 but did not take effect until after the conclusion of the 1981–82 season.)	
Bobby Saxton	9 June 1987	19 September 1988	60	10	14	36	16.7			
Barry Swallow †	19 September 1988	10 October 1988	5	3	0	2	60.0			
John Bird	10 October 1988	23 October 1991	163	49	51	63	30.1			
John Ward	5 November 1991	12 March 1993	72	21	26	25	29.2			
Alan Little	12 March 1993	15 March 1999	328	113	89	126	34.5	Third Division play-off winners: 1993		
Neil Thompson	16 March 1999	9 February 2000	45	11	11	23	24.4			
Terry Dolan	11 February 2000	31 May 2003	173	56	50	67	32.4			
Chris Brass	4 June 2003	8 November 2004	67	14	18	35	20.9			
Viv Busby †	8 November 2004	10 February 2005	14	4	2	8	28.6			
Billy McEwan	10 February 2005	19 November 2007	131	52	31	48	39.7			
Colin Walker	19 November 2007	21 November 2008	58	22	20	16	37.9			
Neil Redfearn †	21 November 2008	24 November 2008	1	0	1	0	0.0			
Martin Foyle	24 November 2008	24 September 2010	102	44	30	28	43.1	FA Trophy runners-up: 2008–09		
Andy Porter †	24 September 2010	6 October 2010	4	1	1	2	25.0			
Steve Torpey †	8 October 2010	13 October 2010	1	0	0	1	0.0			
Gary Mills	13 October 2010	2 March 2013	136	58	45	33	42.6	FA Trophy winners: 2011–12; Conference Premier play-off winners: 2012		
Nigel Worthington	4 March 2013	13 October 2014	76	23	29	24	30.3			
Steve Torpey †	13 October 2014	15 October 2014	0	0	0	0	—			
Russ Wilcox	15 October 2014	26 October 2015	54	13	20	21	24.1			
Richard Cresswell †	26 October 2015	4 November 2015	1	0	0	1	0.0			
Jackie McNamara	4 November 2015	16 October 2016	48	8	12	28	16.7			
Gary Mills	16 October 2016	30 September 2017	53	20	17	16	37.7	FA Trophy winners: 2016–17		
Martin Gray	1 October 2017	19 August 2018	37	14	8	15	37.8			
Sam Collins	20 August 2018	5 January 2019	26	10	5	11	38.5			
Steve Watson	10 January 2019	13 November 2021	91	47	19	25	51.6			
John Askey	13 November 2021	16 November 2022	59	27	15	17	45.8	National League North play-off winners: 2022		
Tim Ryan †	18 November 2022	5 December 2022	3	0	1	2	0.0			
David Webb	5 December 2022	8 February 2023	10	3	2	5	30.0		(Note: Webb's appointment was announced on 2 December 2022 but did not take effect until 5 December. The intervening match, a 1–1 draw at home to Wrexham, was taken by Ryan.) (Note: Webb's record includes two matches which were taken by assistant manager Michael Morton due to Webb being hospitalised with a lung infection. These were wins over Woking and Blyth Spartans, which were the first two matches after Webb commenced duties as manager. His first match in the dugout was a 3–0 home defeat to Gateshead on 26 December 2022.)	
Michael Morton	9 February 2023	28 August 2023	24	6	7	11	25.0			
Tony McMahon †	28 August 2023	6 September 2023	1	0	0	1	0.0			
Neal Ardley	6 September 2023	26 February 2024	34	10	14	10	29.4			
Tony McMahon †	26 February 2024	27 February 2024	0	0	0	0	—			
Adam Hinshelwood	27 February 2024	28 August 2025	66	36	14	16	54.5			
Stuart Maynard	28 August 2025	26 July 2026	45	33	7	5	73.3	National League championship: 2025–26		
Scott Lindsey	27 July 2026	Present	21	7	7	7	33.3			
