= History of York City F.C. =

The history of York City Football Club spans the period from 1922 to the present time. For detail on individual periods of the club's history, see one of the following articles:

- History of York City F.C. (1922–1980)
- History of York City F.C. (1980–present)
