= Bootham Crescent =

Sports stadium in York, England, 1932–2021

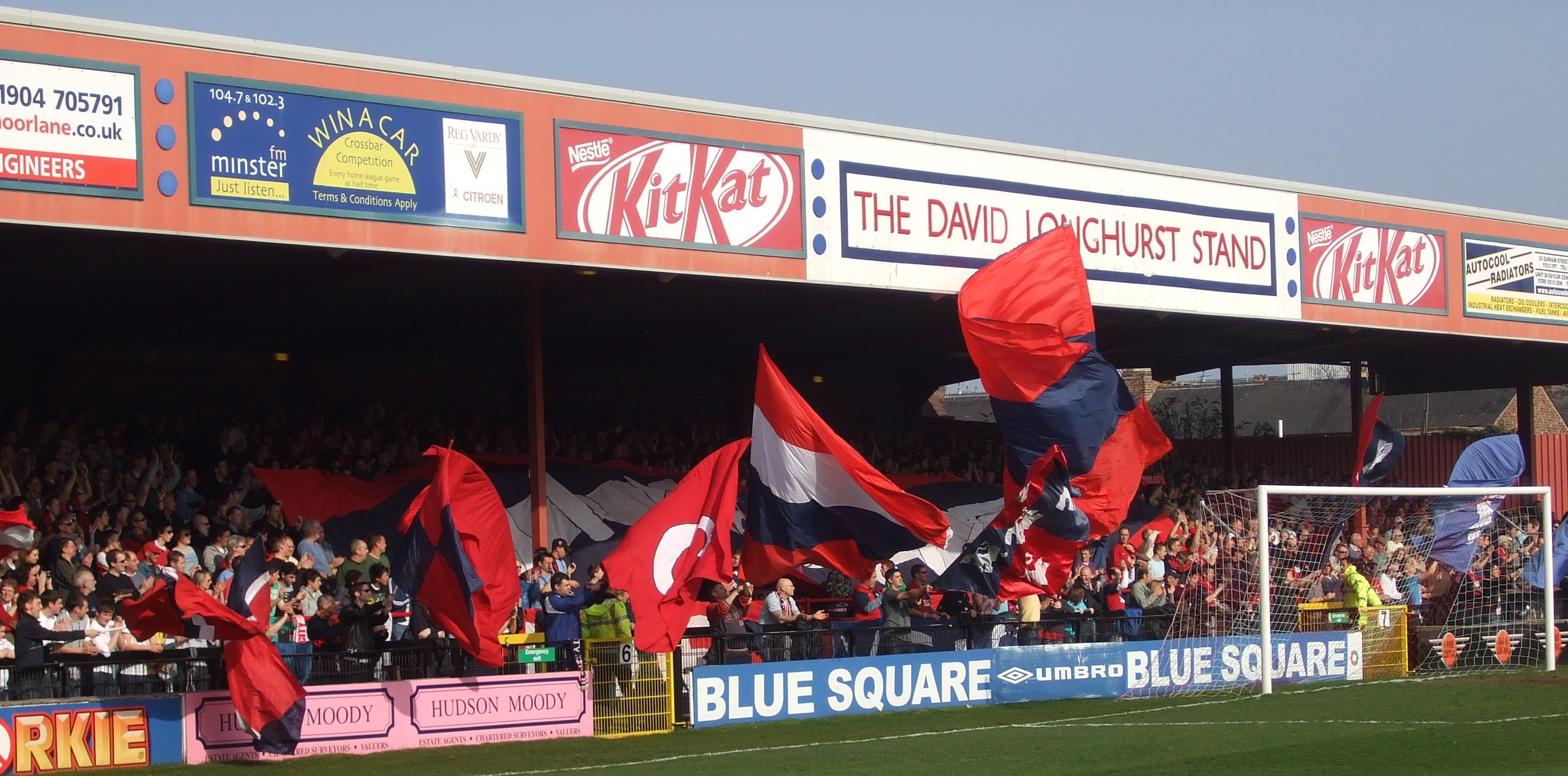
- David Longhurst Stand in 2009

- Location of Bootham Crescent
- Full name: Bootham Crescent
- Former names: KitKat Crescent
- Location: York, England
- Coordinates: 53°58′10″N 1°5′18″W
- Owner: York City F.C.
- Operator: York City F.C.
- Capacity: 8,256 (3,409 seated)
- Surface: Grass
- Record attendance: 28,123 (York City vs Huddersfield Town, FA Cup, 5 March 1938)
- Field size: 104 by 64 metres (114 by 70 yd)

Construction
- Built: 1932
- Opened: 31 August 1932
- Closed: 18 February 2021
- Architects: Ward & Leckenby

Tenants
- York City F.C. (1932–2020); York City Knights (2016–2020)

Bootham Crescent in York, England, was the home of York City Football Club and York City Knights rugby league club. With a capacity of 8,256, it was near the city centre, just over a mile from York railway station. As of February 2023 the ground has been fully demolished to make way for the building of new houses.

York City leased land at Bootham Crescent from York Cricket Club as a replacement for their ground at Fulfordgate on the outskirts of the city. The ground was constructed in four months, and opened on 31 August 1932. In the Second World War, the Popular Stand was converted into an air-raid shelter, and the ground suffered slight damage when a bomb landed on houses along the Shipton Street End. York purchased Bootham Crescent for £4,075 in 1948. Floodlights were fitted at the ground in 1959, and replaced by ones twice as powerful in 1995. A number of improvements were made in the early 1980s, with a gymnasium, offices and a lounge for officials built.

The David Longhurst Stand opened in 1991 after a roof was erected on the Shipton Street End, named after the former York player David Longhurst who died during a match at the ground in 1990. Bootham Crescent hosted Football League matches from 1932 to 2004 and from 2012 to 2016, both spells ending after York were relegated into non-League football. The ground was renamed KitKat Crescent from 2005 to 2010 as part of a sponsorship deal with Nestlé. York City left Bootham Crescent and moved to the York Community Stadium in Huntington in early 2021, and the Bootham Crescent site will be used for housing.

Bootham Crescent comprised four stands: the Main Stand, the Popular Stand, the David Longhurst Stand and the Grosvenor Road End. The ground held a league representative match, neutral club matches, and schoolboy and youth international matches. Other than football, it hosted a concert, firework displays, American football, rugby league matches, and beer festivals. The record attendance of 28,123 was set in March 1938, for an FA Cup match against Huddersfield Town. The highest seasonal average attendance of 10,412 was achieved in 1948–49.

== History ==
=== Construction and early years ===
York City F.C. played at Fulfordgate in Fulford, on the southern outskirts of York, from 1922 to 1932. It was difficult for most supporters to reach, being a good distance from the railway station, and the tram service to Fulford only had a single track. Attendances declined in the club's second and third seasons in the Football League, which the directors blamed on Fulfordgate's location. One director, G. W. Halliday, became convinced that the only solution was to move to a new ground. York Cricket Club left Bootham Crescent, their home for around 50 years, for a new ground at Wigginton Road in January 1932. Preliminary discussions and visits to Bootham Crescent took place, and the directors believed that renting the ground would be cheaper than repaying the debts on Fulfordgate. Further, Bootham Crescent was situated near the centre of the city, and the population living within a mile of the site was, at 30,000, 10 times that within a similar radius of Fulfordgate. However, two former directors argued that attendances at many grounds had fallen during the Great Depression, and that the approaches and surrounds to Bootham Crescent were limited.

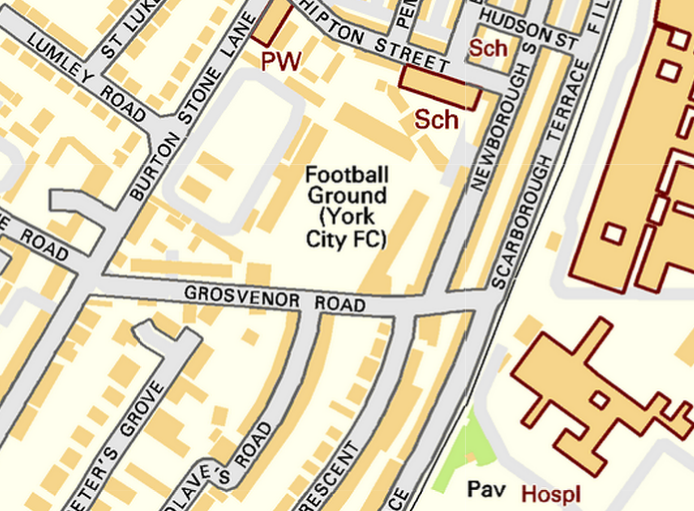
2015 Ordnance Survey map, showing the ground's irregular shape, and how it is hemmed in from four sides

The directors were unanimous that a change should be made, and a special meeting of the shareholders was held on 26 April 1932. The move to Bootham Crescent on a 21-year lease was approved by 115 votes to 37. The site of York's new home was of an irregular shape and was hemmed in from four sides, with a narrow track to the south, barracks to the west, a school and almhouses to the north and terraced houses to the east. Nonetheless, the grounds of the city's football, cricket and rugby league teams were now within a few hundred yards of each other. The ground was renovated over the summer of 1932; the area was drained and then built to the design of local architects Ward & Leckenby. The Popular Stand was erected on the west side using sections of the terrace cover at Fulfordgate, with the Main Stand built opposite. Terraces were banked up in the wedge-shaped areas behind the goals. After four months of construction, Bootham Crescent was ready for the 1932–33 season, with an initial capacity of over 30,000.

The ground was officially opened on 31 August 1932, when York played Stockport County in a Third Division North match. The club president, Sir John Hunt, marked the occasion by cutting a ribbon of the club's colours of chocolate and cream. In attendance were the Lord Mayor of York, the Sheriff of York, the vice-president of the Football League, the treasurer of the Football Association (FA) and the local Member of Parliament. York player Tom Mitchell scored the first goal at the ground in a 2–2 draw, played before 8,106 supporters. In the first four seasons at Bootham Crescent, attendances were not higher, and were sometimes lower than at Fulfordgate. There were problems with the ground in its early years; the quality of the pitch was questioned, and the Lincolnshire Echo remarked in April 1937 that the pitch was "almost a morass, with extensive pools of water in front of the goals". There was an incident in March 1934 where the referee and linesmen were found unconscious in their dressing room, due to fumes from a faulty heater.

=== Improvements and cup runs ===
The ground first hosted a match against First Division opposition on 12 January 1935 when York played Derby County in an FA Cup third-round match, which set a new club record attendance of 13,612. Attendance records were set at four successive stages of the 1937–38 FA Cup, culminating in the 28,123 attendance for the sixth-round match against Huddersfield Town on 5 March 1938. By now the ground's capacity was around 23,000, and seats were placed around the pitch to accommodate more fans. During the Second World War, the tunnel at the back of the Popular Stand was used as an air-raid shelter for pupils and staff of Shipton Street School. The ground was slightly damaged after the air-raid on York in April 1942, when houses along the Shipton Street End were bombed. Considerable improvements were made in the immediate post-war period. Deeper drainage and the concreting of the banking at the Grosvenor Road End were completed, and loudspeaking equipment was installed.

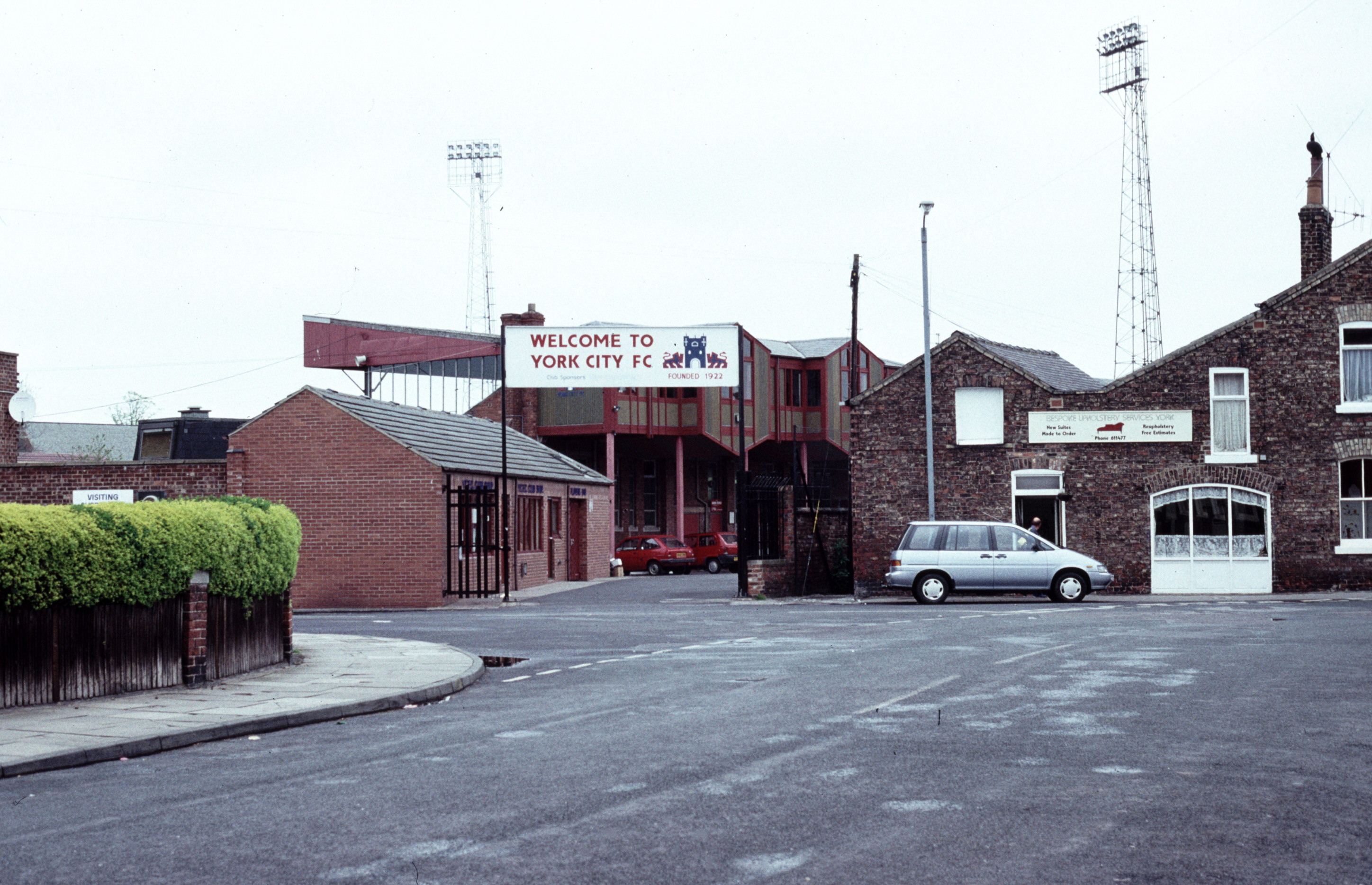
Entrance to the ground (1992 picture), with the Main Stand visible to the left of the entrance sign

It was announced at the shareholders' annual meeting in September 1948 that York had purchased Bootham Crescent for £4,075, with the club's finances in a strong position at the time. Bigger crowds were recorded around the country in the post-war period, and York achieved five-figure average attendances in 1948–49 and 1955–56. Over the late 1940s and early 1950s, concreting was completed on the terracing in the Popular Stand, due to the efforts of the supporters' club, and the Shipton Street End. York reached the semi-final of the 1954–55 FA Cup, and two matches from this run were played at Bootham Crescent: the first-round match against Scarborough, which York won 3–2, and the fifth-round match against Tottenham Hotspur, which was won 3–1 before a crowd of 21,000. During the summer of 1955, the Main Stand was extended towards Shipton Street, funded by profits gained from the FA Cup run and a stand extension fund.

A concrete wall was built at the Grosvenor Road End for over £3,000 in 1956, as a safety precaution and as a support for additional banking and terracing. These improvements saw capacity extended to 23,600. Two FA Cup ties against First Division opposition were held at the ground in 1957–58: Birmingham City were beaten 3–0, followed by a 0–0 draw with Bolton Wanderers, which drew a capacity crowd of 23,600. Floodlights were installed at the ground in the summer of 1959, costing £14,500, a substantial part of which was raised by a supporters' club. They were officially switched on for a friendly against Newcastle United on 28 October 1959, which Newcastle won 8–2 before a crowd of 9,414.

=== Further improvements and a new stand ===
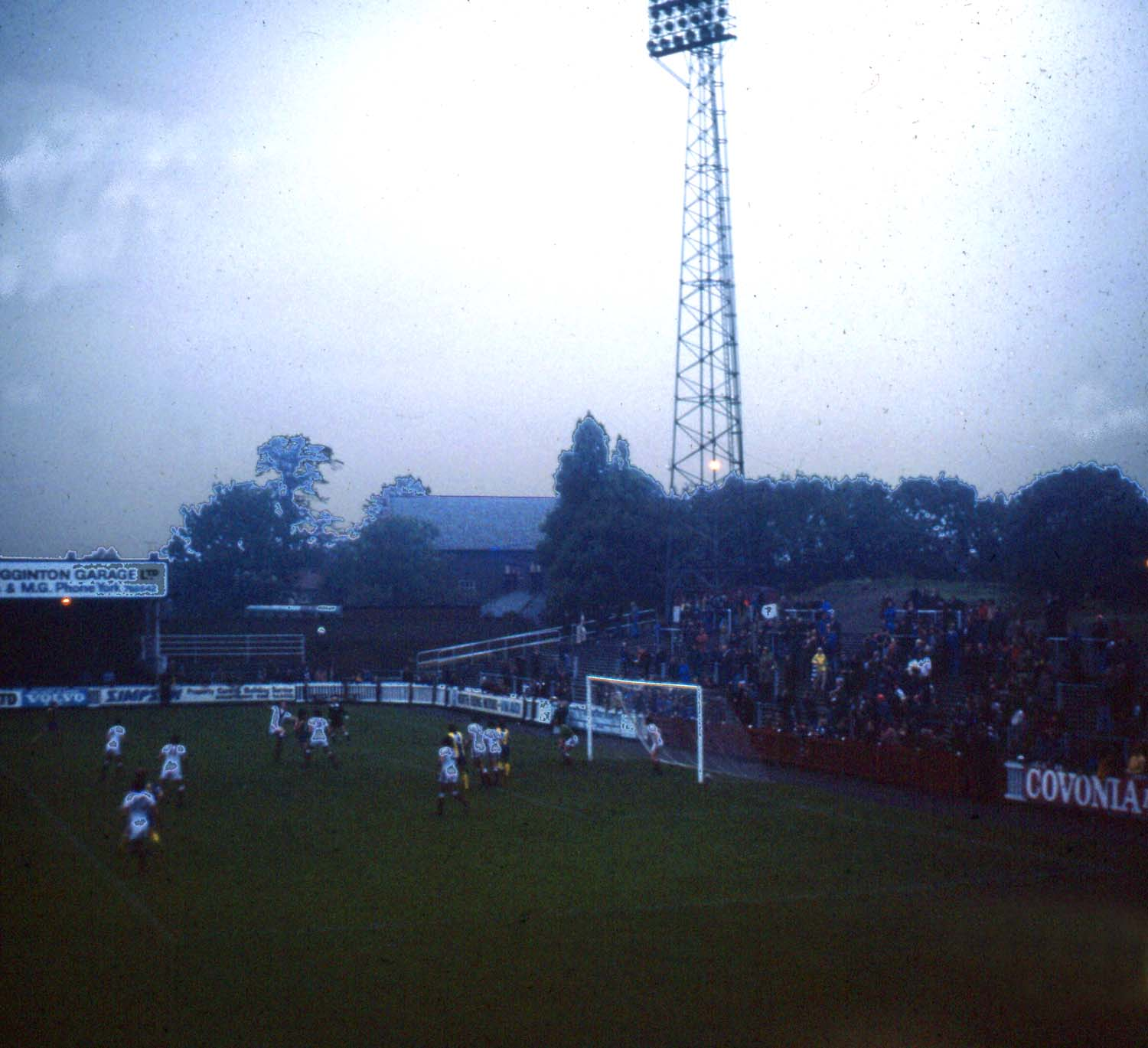
The Shipton Street end in 1976.

York reached the quarter-final of the 1961–62 League Cup, and in the earlier rounds beat Bristol City, Leicester City, Watford and Bournemouth & Boscombe Athletic at Bootham Crescent. The half-time scoreboard at the Shipton Street End ceased to be used by 1965, but remained as advertising boarding. On 5 May 1969, referee Roy Harper collapsed and died on the pitch during a match against Halifax Town. Seats were installed in the Popular Stand for 1974–75, York's first season in the Second Division. This increased the ground's seating capacity to 2,762, but meant the overall capacity was reduced to 16,529. The floodlights were updated and improved for £20,000, and were officially switched on by former Wolverhampton Wanderers player Derek Dougan for a friendly with Grimsby Town on 1 August 1980. A gymnasium was built at the Grosvenor Road End for £50,000 early in 1981, and to help towards this York received £15,000 from the Sports Council and £20,000 from the Football League Improvement Trust. In the summer of 1983, new offices for the manager, secretary, matchday and lottery manager were built, along with a vice-presidents' lounge. The lounge was officially opened by Jack Dunnett, the chairman of the Football League, prior to a match against Wrexham in November 1983.

By the early 1980s cracks had appeared in the wall built at the back of the Grosvenor Road End. The rear of the terracing was cordoned off, and the capacity of the ground reduced to under 13,500. The Grosvenor Road End was segregated and allocated to away supporters, and fencing was erected for the first time before the FA Cup match against Liverpool in February 1985. All the fencing had been dismantled by the early 2000s. During the 1983–84 and 1984–85 seasons, problems had arisen in handling big crowds, due to the ground having only two of four sides available for entry and exit, and the home supporters funnelling through the car park to the Shipton Street End. Extensive improvements were made in the summer of 1985 for approximately £100,000, and eight new turnstiles were installed at the Shipton Street End. Further, the dressing rooms were refurbished to incorporate new baths and showers, and a new referees' changing room and physiotherapist's treatment room were readied. Hospitality boxes were built into the Main Stand during 1986–87, and video equipment was installed inside the ground. Crash barriers were strengthened, meaning ground safety requirements were met. These improvements meant that shortly before the Taylor Report was published, the ground's capacity was 14,109, including 3,059 seats. However, by September 1989, the capacity had been increased to 14,628.

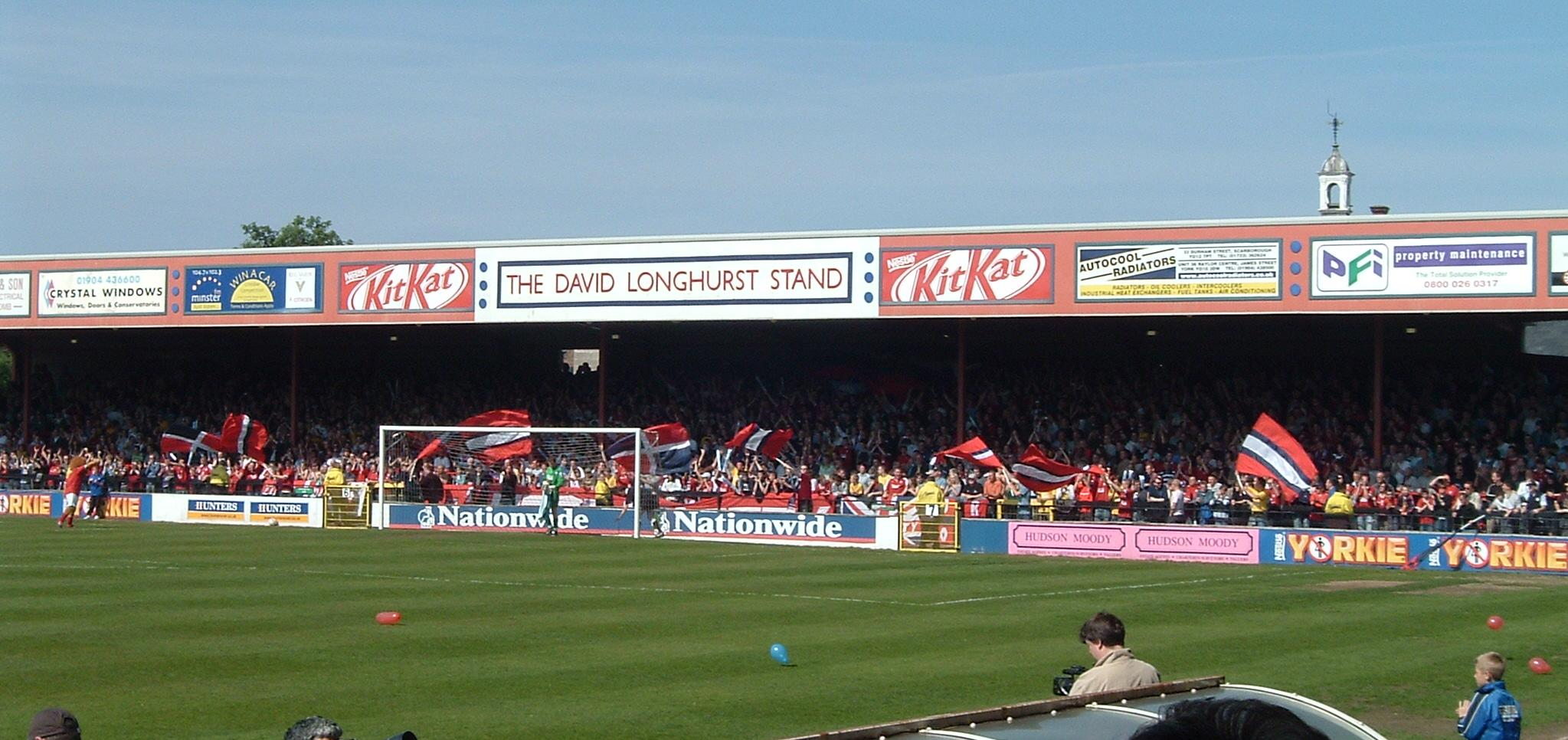
David Longhurst Stand (2007 picture) opened in 1990, after a stand was built on the Shipton Street End.

The ground's major drawback was the lack of covered standing accommodation at the Shipton Street End, but the cost of erecting a stand had been prohibitive. The Shipton Street Roof Appeal was launched in the spring of 1988 to raise money for a stand, and fundraising schemes were put into place. On 8 September 1990, York player David Longhurst collapsed and died from heart failure during a match against Lincoln City at Bootham Crescent. With the approval of his family, the David Longhurst Memorial Fund was launched, and all donations were added to the monies already raised for the roof appeal. The Football Trust contributed half of the £150,000 cost of the stand, and it was constructed in the summer of 1991. The David Longhurst Stand was officially opened on 14 October 1991 in a friendly match against Leeds United, which was watched by a crowd of 4,374.

=== 1990s to 2022 ===
The Family Stand was opened in the Main Stand in 1992, and manager John Ward ran the London Marathon to help raise funds for the project. Bootham Crescent first hosted a play-off match when York beat Bury 1–0 on 19 May 1993 in the Third Division play-off semi-final; the attendance of 9,206 was the ground's highest in seven years. During 1993–94 the Main Stand paddock was seated and covered, and the recent work to the stand cost £220,000. The ground's capacity fell to 9,459, including seating for 3,645, after the renovations to the David Longhurst and Main Stands. In May 1995, a new drainage system was installed for £11,000, to improve the quality of the pitch during winter. New floodlights were installed in June 1995 at a cost of £122,000, and despite being shorter in height were twice as powerful as the original floodlights. A water tower was installed in the late 1990s, to further help the pitch quality.

In July 1999, York's real property assets, including Bootham Crescent, were transferred to a holding company called Bootham Crescent Holdings (BCH) for £165,000. Chairman Douglas Craig put the ground and the club up for sale for £4.5 million in December 2001. It was announced that the ground would close by 30 June 2002, and talks were held over a move to Huntington Stadium. In March 2002, the club was bought by John Batchelor; he said York could continue at Bootham Crescent until a new stadium was built, when in fact the previous 25-year lease was replaced with one that would expire in June 2003. Batchelor spoke of building a new stadium at Clifton Moor, and Persimmon, who held 10% of the shares in BCH, submitted planning applications for 93 homes on the site of Bootham Crescent. In March 2003, York extended their lease of the ground to May 2004, and under the ownership of the Supporters' Trust proceeded with plans to move to Huntington Stadium. Planning problems arose with bringing the ground up to Football League standards, and the club preferred to stay at Bootham Crescent. York bought Bootham Crescent in February 2004, after a £2 million loan from the Football Stadia Improvement Fund (FSIF) was secured.

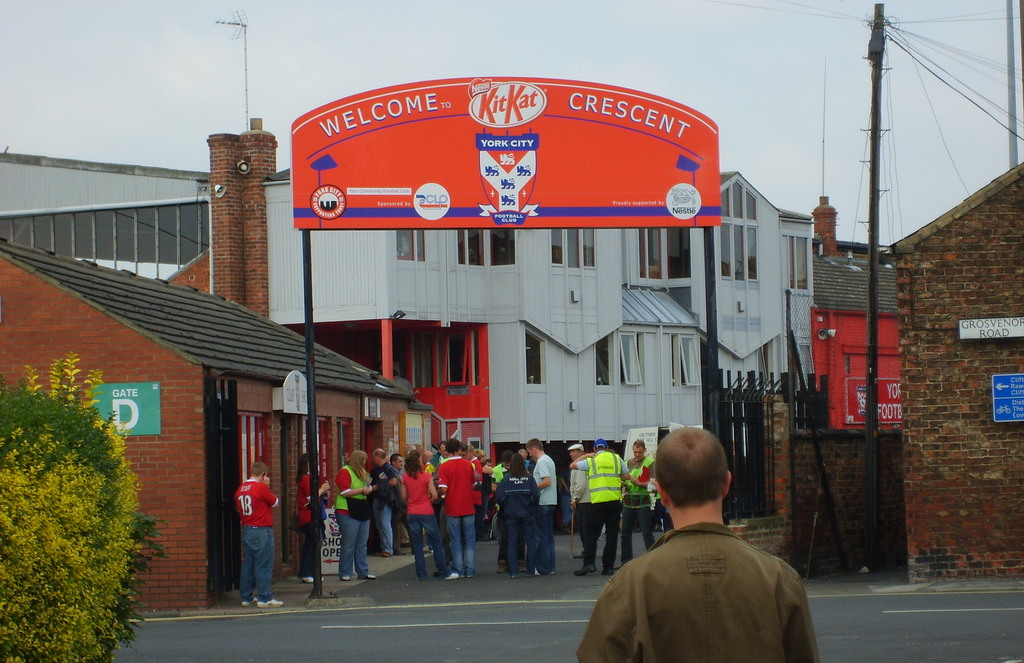
The entrance as KitKat Crescent in 2006

York were relegated to the Conference National for 2004–05, which brought an end to 72 years of Football League football at Bootham Crescent. In January 2005 the ground was renamed KitKat Crescent, as part of a sponsorship deal under which Nestlé donated £100,000 to the club. This money went towards covering the shortfall the club faced paying BCH directors, Persimmon and stamp duty when buying the ground. The ground was still commonly referred to as Bootham Crescent. The deal expired in January 2010, when Nestlé ended all their sponsorship arrangements with the club. York returned to the Football League for 2012–13, and their first League Two match at Bootham Crescent was a 3–1 defeat to Wycombe Wanderers on 18 August 2012, before a 4,591 crowd. The club was relegated to the National League for 2016–17, ending a four-year spell back in the Football League. The final game to be played at Bootham Crescent saw York City host Guiseley AFC with York centre-back Josh King scoring the only goal of the game which unknowingly became the final goal there. A charity match played on 24 April 2021 raised £4000 for local charities. The ground had not been subject to any major investment since the 1990s, and faced problems with holes in the Main Stand roof, crumbling in the Grosvenor Road End, drainage problems and toilet conditions.

Bootham Crescent was officially handed to Persimmon Homes in April 2022 and demolition began within weeks.

== Future ==
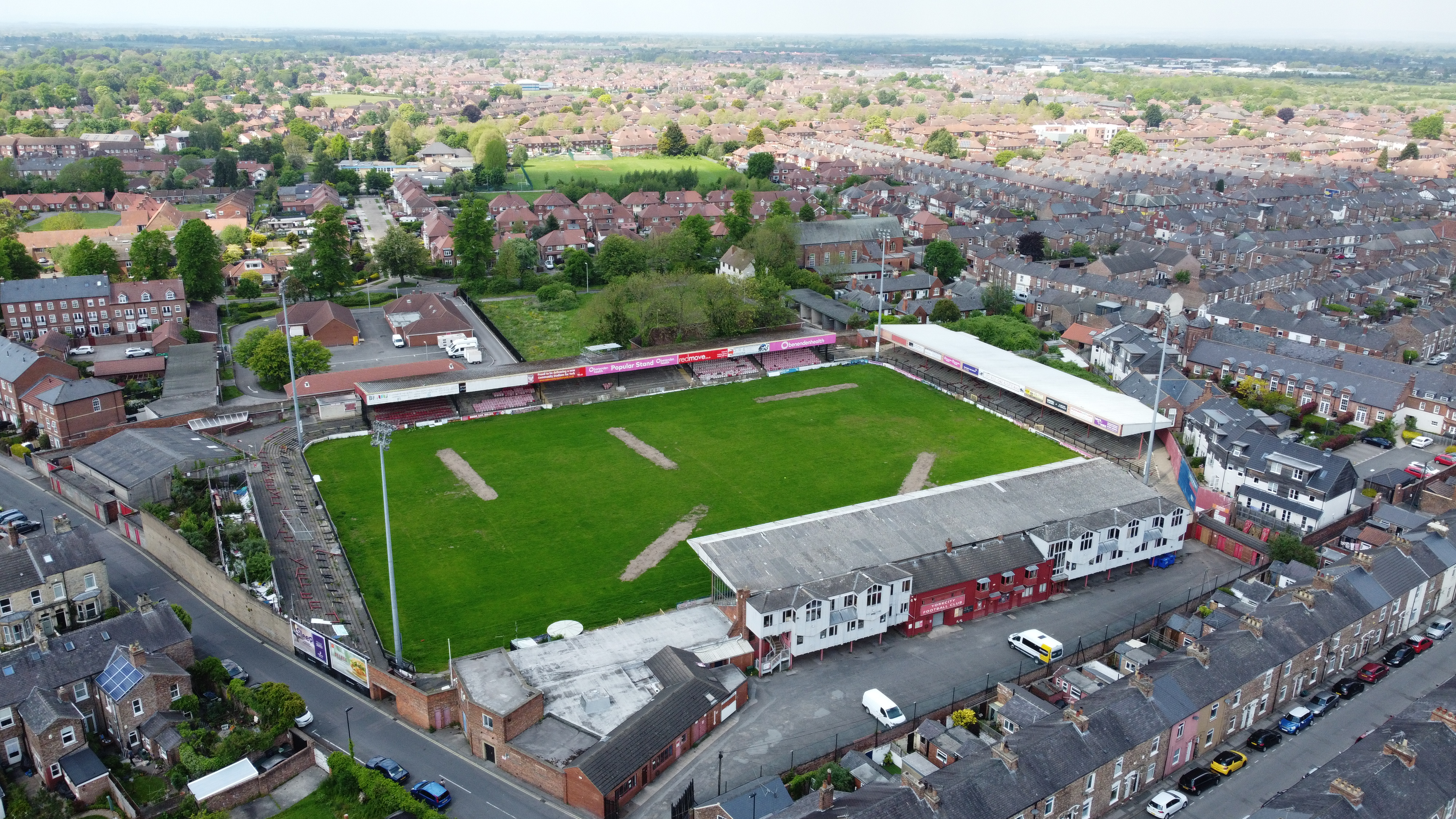
The ground lying disused in 2021

=== Football Club ===
The terms of the FSIF loan required the club to identify a site for a new stadium by 2007, and have detailed planning permission by 2009, to avoid financial penalties. Once plans for a new stadium were in place, the loan would turn into a grant to assist in funding the relocation. As part of the loan agreement, Persimmon have first refusal on purchasing Bootham Crescent once York leave, for 10% lower than its market value. Persimmon still intend to build 93 homes on the site, and the proceeds of the sale would go towards building the new stadium. In March 2008, York's managing director Jason McGill cited "the annual cost of £60,000 for the maintenance and upkeep of a 1932 stadium with few commercial and income-generating opportunities" as the reason for the continued need to move to a new stadium.

Despite the club failing to formally identify a site by the end of 2007, financial penalties were not incurred, as the FSIF were satisfied with the progress made. However, McGill said plans with the preferred site had ground to a halt by March 2008. City of York Council announced its commitment to building a community stadium in May 2008, which would be used by York and the city's rugby league club, York City Knights. In July 2010, the council chose the option of building a 6,000-all-seater stadium at Monks Cross in Huntington, on the site of Huntington Stadium. In August 2014, Greenwich Leisure Ltd were named as the council's preferred bidder to deliver an 8,000-all-seater stadium, a leisure complex and a community hub. Construction started in December 2017, for completion in mid 2019. After a number of delays, the stadium was completed and handed to the operators GLL in December 2020, with the opening game in February 2021 seeing York City take on AFC Fylde ended in a 3–1 victory for Fylde, Alex Whitmore scoring the opening goal at the stadium.

=== Site ===
Persimmon Homes are, as at May 2025, in the process of constructing 93 homes on the site, made up of 36 apartments and 57 houses. In recognition of the history of the site, the roads and apartment buildings are named as follows:

- Alf Patrick Court
- David Longhurst Way
- Keith Walwyn Walk
- Mitchell House
- Jackson House
- Sherrington House
- Lockie House

In addition part of the centre circle, a section of a stand and a York City Football Club flag will commemorate the history of the site.

== Structure and facilities ==
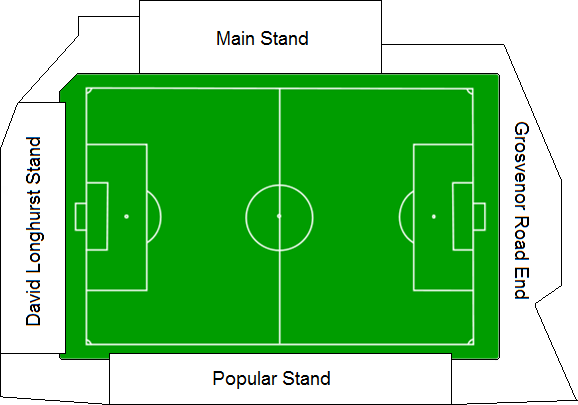
Schematic plan view of Bootham Crescent's stands

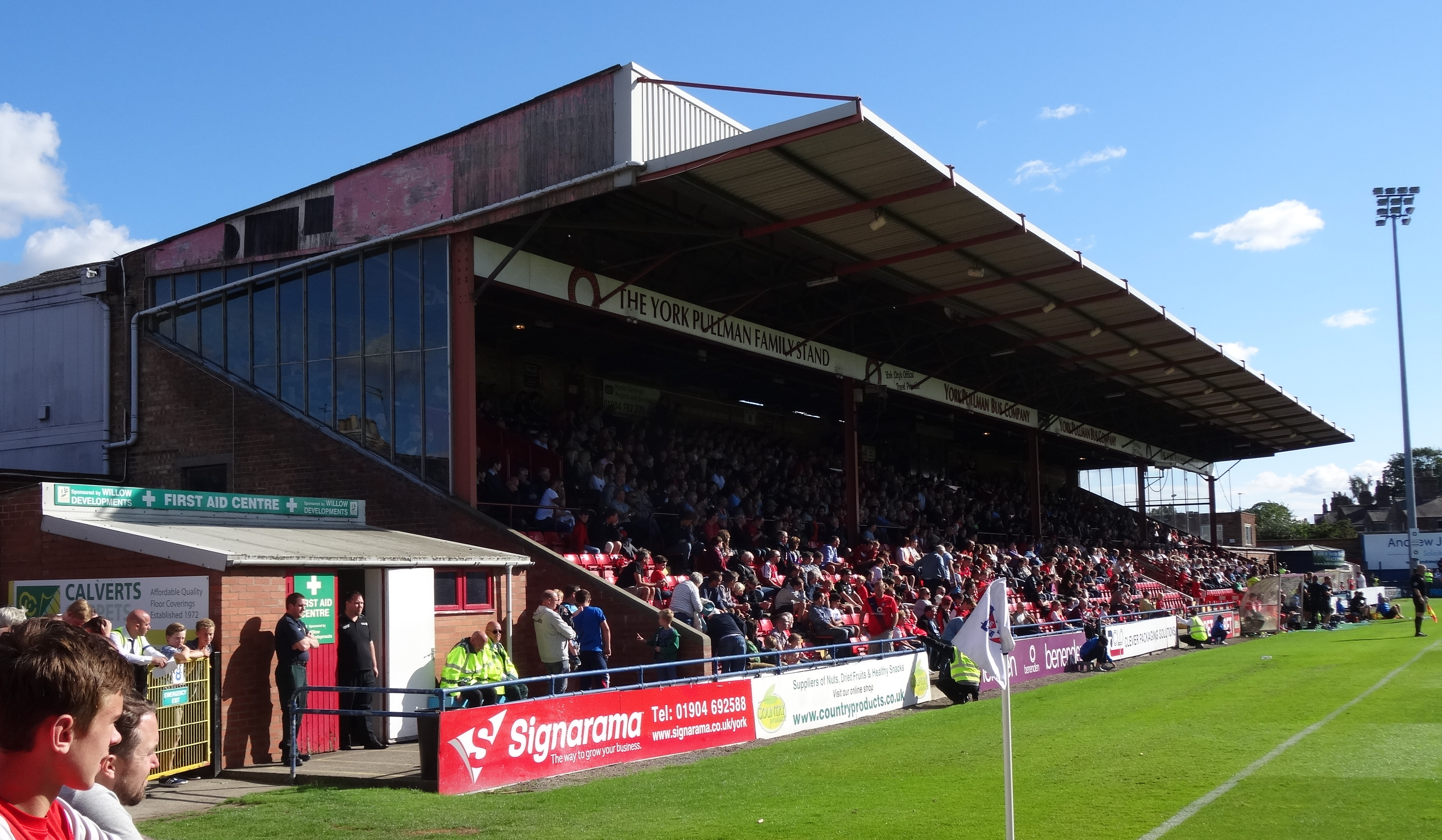
Main Stand in 2015

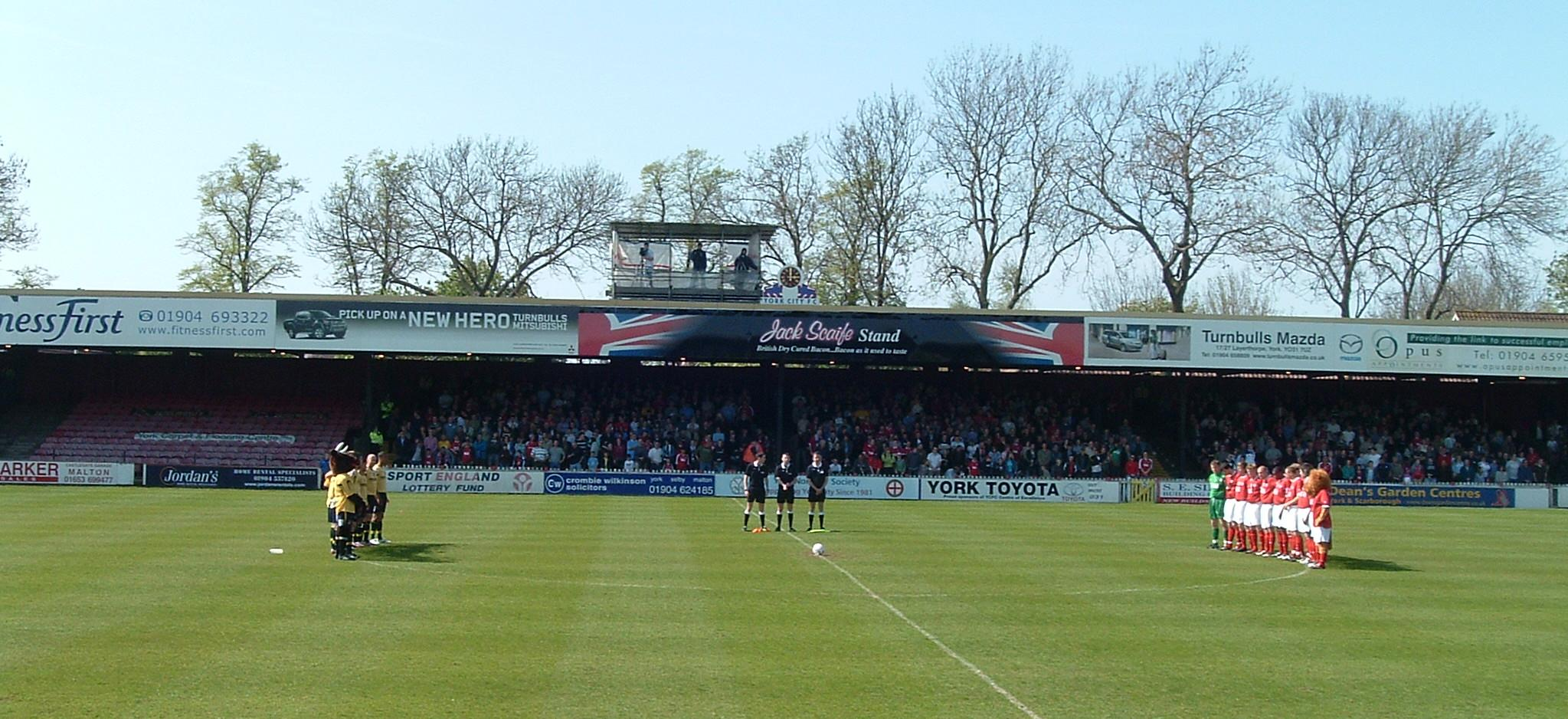
Popular Stand in 2007

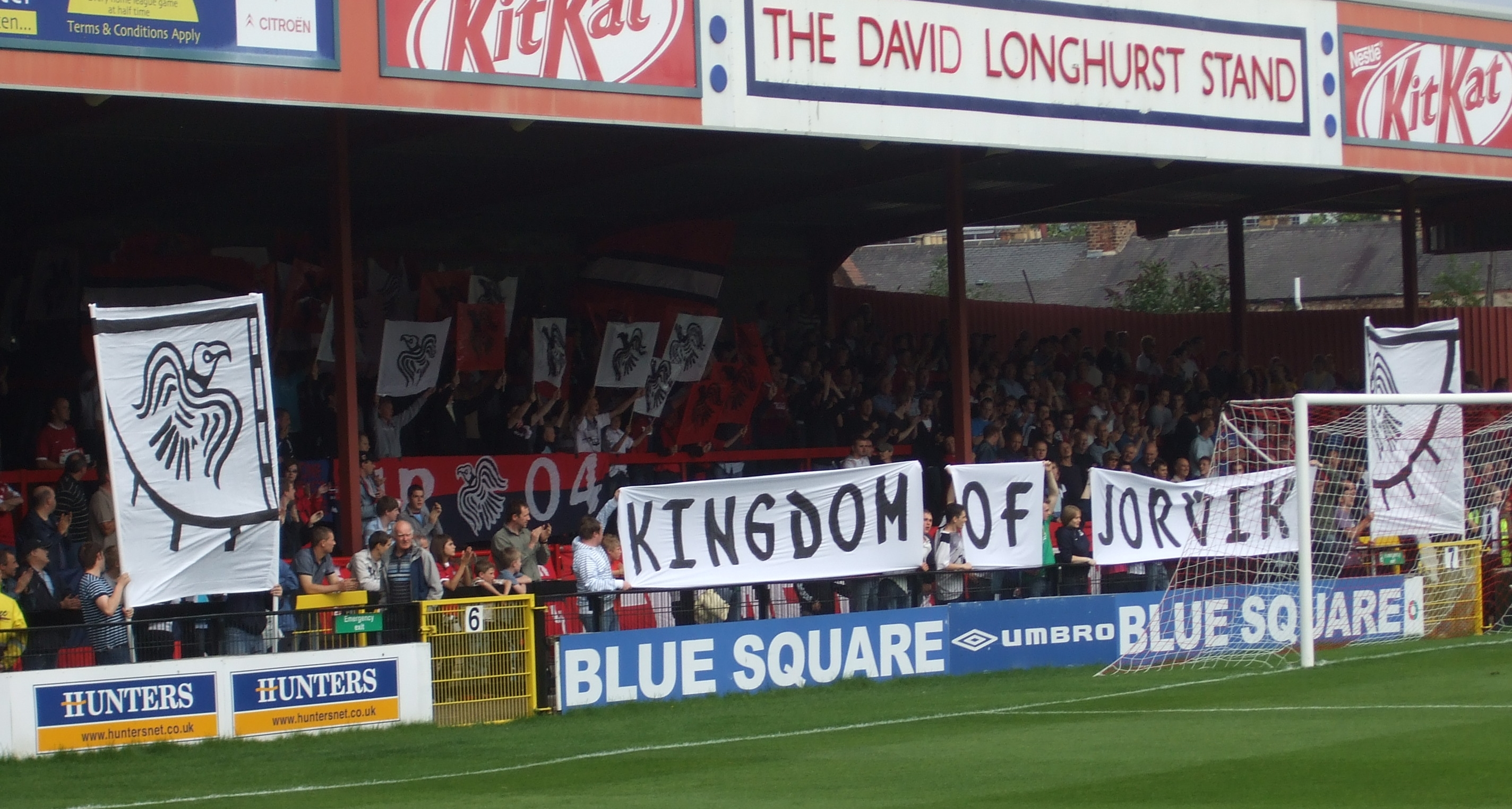
David Longhurst Stand in 2008

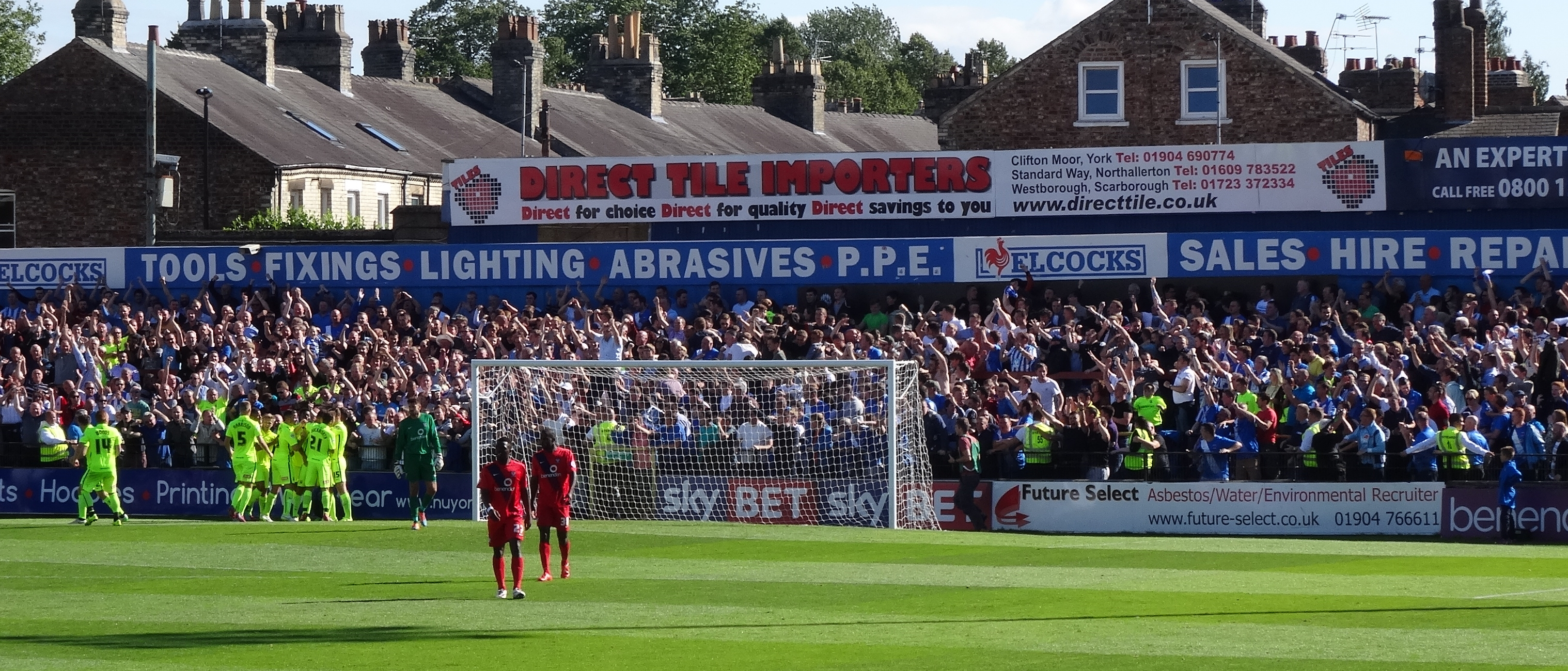
Grosvenor Road End in 2015

The ground could accommodate 8,256 supporters, including seating for 3,409, and comprised four stands; the Main Stand, the Popular Stand, the David Longhurst Stand and the Grosvenor Road End.

The Main Stand, which could seat 1,757 spectators, was an all-seated stand which ran around two-thirds of the pitch. It contained the dressing rooms, club offices, ticket offices and hospitality suites, and had a number of supporting pillars. The stand had open corners to either side, the supporters' club located in one corner, and to the rear had windows to either side. At the front was the Family Stand, which offered adjusted rates for children and their carers. Opposite was the Popular Stand, a covered all-seated stand, which had a number of supporting pillars and a television gantry on its roof. It could seat 1,652 spectators.

The northernmost stand of the ground was the David Longhurst Stand, which was a covered terrace for home supporters and had a row of supporting pillars across its front. The stand was originally known as the Shipton Street End, but was renamed following the death of David Longhurst, and has a capacity of 3,062. Opposite was the Grosvenor Road End, an open terrace reserved for away supporters, which held a capacity of 1,785. As well as this, away fans were permitted to use 332 seats of the Popular Stand, in the section closest to the Grosvenor Road End. The toilet facilities for away supporters consisted of open air urinals and Portakabins.

The grass pitch measured 104 by 64 metres (114 by 70 yd). Head groundsman Bryan Foster was presented with a gold watch from the directors in March 1988, in recognition of his long and outstanding service. His successor, Bryan Horner, was voted the Second Division groundsman of the year in 1999. A club shop was situated just inside the car park, which also housed the commercial manager's office. Adjoining this was the social club, known as the 1922 Bar since August 2015, and the players' bar.

== Transport ==
The ground was located just over a mile from York railway station, which is approximately a 20-minute walk. The station lies on the East Coast Main Line between London King's Cross railway station and Edinburgh Waverley railway station, and has direct services from Birmingham, Liverpool, Manchester, Newcastle upon Tyne and South West England. Many of the roads near the ground are for residential permit holders only, meaning car parking at the ground was notoriously difficult. The author Simon Inglis pointed out the irony of the club leaving Fulfordgate because of its location, when "it is harder than ever for fans to drive in to Bootham Crescent". Parking on matchdays at nearby York Hospital was available. A park and ride facility operates in the city, and a number of lines dropped off within walking distance of the ground.

== Other uses ==
Bootham Crescent hosted a war-time representative match in which the Football League XI beat the Northern Command XI 9–2 on 17 October 1942, before a 5,500 crowd. It held a university representative match on 17 February 1976, when a FA XI drew 2–2 with the Universities Athletic Union; the FA XI included former England internationals and 1966 World Cup winners Bobby Charlton and Nobby Stiles. The ground hosted its first major neutral match on 7 February 1968, when Middlesbrough beat Hull City 1–0 in an FA Cup third-round second replay, in front of a crowd of 16,524. During 2012–13, Bootham Crescent held one fixture apiece for Harrogate Town and Gateshead, as the pitches at their grounds were unplayable. The ground hosted the 2013 FA Women's Premier League Cup Final on 5 May 2013, when Aston Villa beat Leeds United 5–4 on penalties after a 0–0 extra-time draw.

The ground first held international football on 10 May 1952, when England schools, captained by future York manager Wilf McGuinness, beat Ireland 5–0 before 16,000 spectators. It has hosted a number of youth international matches, most notably the England under-18s' 4–0 win over Northern Ireland on 13 October 1996, in which 16-year-old Michael Owen scored a hat-trick for England. Bootham Crescent hosted three matches in the 2001 UEFA European Under-16 Championship, including France's 2–0 win over Russia in the quarter-final on 30 April 2001, watched by 557 spectators.

The ground has also held non-football events. It hosted a music concert in September 1979 and a grand fireworks display in October 1982 to celebrate the centenary of the Yorkshire Evening Press. Sporting events to have taken place include an American football game in the summer of 1988, and a rugby league match between York and Leeds in the Challenge Cup before a crowd of 11,347 on 29 January 1989, which was won 28–9 by Leeds. York City Knights have played at Bootham Crescent since 2016, ahead of the move to the Community Stadium. The ground hosted baseball, an exhibition game in May 1934 and in 1937 the home fixtures of York City Maroons in the 8 team Yorkshire League. In August 2017, the ground was transformed into the 1936 Berlin Olympics stadium for filming a Bollywood film Gold (2018 film). Beer festivals, organised by the York Minstermen supporters' group, were held at the ground's social club from 2008 to 2012.

== Records ==
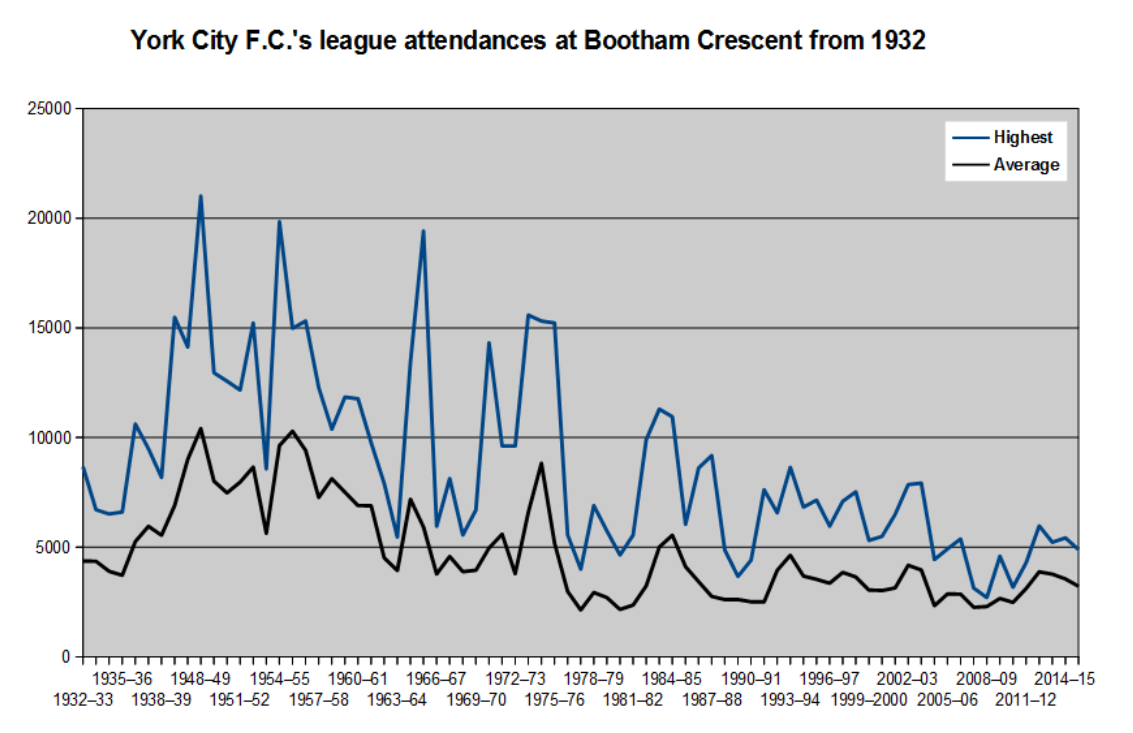
York City's highest and average league attendances at Bootham Crescent from the 1932–33 season

The highest attendance record at the ground was 28,123 for a match against Huddersfield Town in the FA Cup sixth round on 5 March 1938. The highest attendance in the Football League is 21,010 against Hull City in the Third Division North on 23 April 1949. The attendance of 1,167 against Northampton Town on 5 May 1981 is the lowest ever to see York in a Football League match. York were relegated to the Conference National in 2004, and their highest home attendance in this division was 6,660 for a match against Morecambe on 4 May 2007. The lowest was 1,567 for a match against Exeter City on 10 March 2008. The lowest attendance at the ground for any first-team fixture was 608 for a Conference League Cup third-round match against Mansfield Town on 4 November 2008.

The highest seasonal average attendance for York at Bootham Crescent was 10,412 in 1948–49. York's lowest seasonal average was 2,139 in 1977–78, which came after two successive relegations from the Second Division. The most recent season in which the average attendance was more than 10,000 was in 1955–56. This season also saw York's highest total seasonal attendance at the ground, which was 236,685. The lowest total seasonal attendance was 48,357 for 1977–78 in the Fourth Division.

York's biggest margin of victory at Bootham Crescent was by eight goals, achieved with a 9–1 win over Southport in the Third Division North on 2 February 1957. Their biggest margin of defeat at the ground was by seven goals, when they were beaten 7–0 by Rochdale in a Third Division North match on 14 January 1939. The most goals scored in a match was 12 on 16 November 1935, when York defeated Mansfield Town 7–5 in the Third Division North.
