= William Collier (footballer) =

Scottish footballer

Personal information
- Date of birth: 11 December 1892
- Place of birth: Dysart, Scotland
- Date of death: 17 April 1954 (aged 61)
- Place of death: Bridge of Earn, Scotland
- Position: Left half

Senior career*
Years	Team	Apps	(Gls)
1912–1915	Kirkcaldy United		
1920–1924	Raith Rovers	129	(7)
1924–1925	Sheffield Wednesday	14	(0)
1925–1930	Kettering Town		

International career
1922	Scotland	1	(0)

Managerial career
- 1925–1930: Kettering Town
- 1930–1937: Dartford
- * Club domestic league appearances and goals

William Collier (11 December 1892 – 17 April 1954) was a Scottish footballer who played for Raith Rovers, Sheffield Wednesday, Kettering Town (as player-manager) and Scotland.

His introduction into professional football was delayed until he was in his late 20s due to World War I, during which he served in the Fife and Forfar Yeomanry and the Black Watch. Barely two years after making his first appearance for Raith (where alongside the likes of David Morris he was part of the side that secured their highest ever league finishes: 3rd in 1921–22 and 4th in 1923–24), he had been selected for his only international cap, against Wales in February 1922.

His younger brother Jock Collier was also a footballer.
