= Billy Sherrington =

English football manager (1890–1977)

Personal information
- Full name: George William Sherrington
- Date of birth: 18 November 1890
- Place of birth: Blaydon, England
- Date of death: 1977 (aged 86–87)

Managerial career
- Years: Team
- 1930–1933: York City

George William Sherrington (18 November 1890 – 1977) worked in various roles at York City Football Club, England, where he was dubbed 'Mr. York City'.

== Career ==
Sherrington was one of the founders of York City and was an original director. He was appointed as honorary secretary in 1924. He relinquished his seat on the board in February 1930 and was appointed as full-time secretary. He combined his work as secretary with those of manager in the early 1930s. He also did this in the mid-1950s, during York City's semi-final FA Cup run, when he shared managerial duties with Tom Lockie. He received the Football League's long service medal in 1951. He retired in 1961 and became the club's president until he died in 1977. Due to his lifetime of service to the club, he was named 'Mr. York City'.

== Managerial statistics ==
Managerial record by team and tenure
Team	From	To	Record				
Team	From	To	P	W	D	L	Win %
York City	May 1930	2 May 1933	130	50	21	59	38.5
