= Barry Lyons (footballer) =

English footballer

Personal information
- Full name: Barry Lyons
- Date of birth: 14 March 1945 (age 81)
- Place of birth: Shirebrook, England
- Position: Winger

Senior career*
Years	Team	Apps	(Gls)
1963–1967	Rotherham United	125	(23)
1966–1973	Nottingham Forest	203	(28)
1973–1976	York City	85	(11)
1976–1979	Darlington	97	(10)

Managerial career
- 1980–1981: York City
- * Club domestic league appearances and goals

Barry Lyons (born 14 March 1945) is an English former professional footballer and manager.

== Playing career ==
Born in Shirebrook, Derbyshire, Lyons started his career with Rotherham United in 1963, making his debut in September 1963. He moved to Nottingham Forest for £45,000 in November 1966. During his time at Forest, he came close to earning a cap for the England U23 team. He was a part of the team which was runner-up in the First Division in the 1966–67 season.

Lyons joined York City for £12,000 in September 1973, where showed some class performances as York won promotion. He scored York's first goal in the higher division, which came against Aston Villa. He moved to Darlington on a free transfer in April 1976 and finished his playing career with the club.

== Managerial career ==
Lyons returned to York City as youth coach in 1979. He became caretaker manager in March 1980 as they were battling to avoid re-election, which he succeeded in doing, and was given the job permanently. He was however removed from the job in December 1981 due to poor results (York having had to seek re-election at the end of the 1980–81 season). He continued in the role of youth team manager until July 1982.

== Managerial statistics ==
Team	Nat	From	To	Record				
Team	Nat	From	To	G	W	L	D	Win %
York City	(England)	18 March 1980	1 December 1981	72	21	37	14	29.16
