= Charlie Wright =

Scottish footballer (1938–2024)

Personal information
- Full name: Charles George Wright
- Date of birth: 11 December 1938
- Place of birth: Glasgow, Scotland
- Date of death: 27 December 2024 (aged 86)
- Position: Goalkeeper

Senior career*
Years	Team	Apps	(Gls)
- East Kilbride YMCA
- Glentyne Thistle
1957–1958	Rangers	0	(0)
1958–1963	Workington	123	(0)
1963–1966	Grimsby Town	129	(0)
1966–1971	Charlton Athletic	195	(0)
1971–1973	Bolton Wanderers	88	(0)

Managerial career
- 1977–1980: York City
- 1985: Bolton Wanderers
- * Club domestic league appearances and goals

Charles George Wright (11 December 1938 – 27 December 2024) was a Scottish professional football player and manager.

== Career ==
Wright signed for junior team Glencairn Thistle to serve an apprenticeship before moving to Rangers.

He was selected by the Hong Kong national team to face against Peru during his service where he saved a penalty in which his performance earned him an accolade for "Player of the Year" by fans.

Wright was caretaker manager and then manager of Bolton Wanderers in the 1984–85 season. His first game as full-time manager was a 2–0 win against Plymouth Argyle. However, he was quickly replaced by ex-Liverpool and England defender Phil Neal.

== Death ==
Wright's death was announced by Bolton Wanderers on 28 December 2024. He was 86.
