= Tom Mitchell (English footballer) =

English footballer and manager

Personal information
- Full name: Thomas Morris Mitchell
- Date of birth: 30 September 1899
- Place of birth: Spennymoor, England
- Date of death: 22 November 1984 (aged 85)
- Place of death: York, England
- Height: 5 ft 8 in (1.73 m)
- Position: Outside left

Senior career*
Years	Team	Apps	(Gls)
	Parkside United	?	(?)
	Tudhoe United	?	(?)
	Spennymoor United	?	(?)
	Blyth Spartans	?	(?)
1920–1926	Newcastle United	60	(5)
1926–1931	Leeds United	142	(19)
1931–1932	York City	23	(5)

Managerial career
- 1937–1950: York City
- * Club domestic league appearances and goals

Thomas Morris Mitchell (30 September 1899 – 22 November 1984) was an English professional footballer and manager.

== Playing career ==
Mitchell started his career with Newcastle United in 1920. He joined Leeds United in 1926. He left them for York City in 1931. Mitchell scored York's first goal at Bootham Crescent in a 2–2 draw with Stockport County on 31 August 1932.

== Managerial career ==
He was appointed as York's manager in March 1937. He resigned in February 1950 and set up a family sport outfitter's shop in York. He later became a director at the club.

== Baseball ==
Tom Mitchell played the 1936 season for the newly formed Leeds Oaks baseball club in the inaugural season of the Yorkshire Baseball League. He scored the Oaks' first ever run in the competition.
