= Jock Collier =

Scottish footballer and manager

Personal information
- Date of birth: 1 February 1897
- Place of birth: Dysart, Scotland
- Date of death: 28 December 1940 (aged 43)
- Place of death: Kingston upon Hull, England
- Height: 5 ft 9 in (1.75 m)
- Position: Right half

Senior career*
Years	Team	Apps	(Gls)
	Victoria Hawthorn	?	(?)
	Denbeath Star	?	(?)
	Inverkeithing United	?	(?)
	Raith Rovers	?	(?)
1920–1925	Hull City	168	(0)
1926–1927	Queens Park Rangers	36	(1)
1928	York City	2	(0)

Managerial career
- 1928–1930: York City
- 1933–1937: York City
- * Club domestic league appearances and goals

John C. Collier (1 February 1897 – 28 December 1940) was a Scottish footballer and manager.

== Career ==
Born in Dysart, Fife, Collier played for Inverkeithing Juniors and had trials for the Scottish Junior international team. He signed for Raith Rovers (Note: The Record of pre-war Scottish League Players has no notes on Jock Collier playing for Raith Rovers or even signing for them. As his brother William joined the club in 1920 and soon became well-known playing in a similar position, it is possible that Jock did play for them but his appearances have become 'mixed' in with those of William, or alternatively William's signing event was attributed to Jock in error in other sources.) and eventually signed for Hull City in 1920. He captained Hull for a couple of seasons, before moving to Queens Park Rangers in 1926.

He joined York City as player-manager, but broke an ankle and retired from playing. He managed the club as they entered the Football League, but after their first season in the league he left the club to become a publican.

Collier was re-appointed as manager in May 1933. He announced his retirement from football in March 1937, and went into a business partnership with one of his brothers in Scotland. He died in Kingston upon Hull, East Riding of Yorkshire, in 1940, at the age of 43. His brother William Collier was also a footballer who played once for Scotland.
