= Dick Duckworth (footballer, born 1906) =

English footballer and manager

Personal information
- Full name: Richard Duckworth
- Date of birth: 6 June 1906
- Place of birth: Harpurhey, Manchester, England
- Date of death: 9 April 1983 (aged 76)
- Place of death: Sheffield, England
- Height: 5 ft 10 in (1.78 m)
- Position: Full-back

Senior career*
Years	Team	Apps	(Gls)
	Castleton Juniors	?	(?)
1925	Rochdale	0	(0)
1926	Manchester United	0	(0)
1927	Oldham Athletic	0	(0)
1929–1931	Chesterfield	89	(4)
1932	Southport	25	(1)
1932–1933	Chester	30	(0)
1934–1935	Rotherham United	46	(0)
1936–1938	York City	88	(0)
	Newark Town	?	(?)

Managerial career
- Newark Town
- 1950–1952: York City
- 1952–1956: Stockport County
- 1957–1960: Darlington
- 1960–1964: Scunthorpe United
- * Club domestic league appearances and goals

Richard Duckworth (6 June 1906 – 9 April 1983) was an English football player and manager.

== Playing career ==
Duckworth was a utility player and began his career with Castleton Juniors, subsequently moving on to Rochdale, Manchester United, Oldham Athletic, Chesterfield, Southport, Chester, Rotherham United and York City. At York, he was captain when the team reached the sixth round of the FA Cup.

== Managerial career ==
Duckworth began his managerial career as player-manager with non-league Newark Town. After working as a coach with Chesterfield, he moved to manage York City in March 1950. His last game as York's manager was against Stockport County on 18 October 1952, who he had agreed to join three days earlier, and took up their managerial duties following the game. After four years with the club, he joined Darlington and later Scunthorpe United. During his time at Scunthorpe he steered the club to its highest-ever league finish of 4th in Division Two in 1962. However, the club were relegated two years later, and Duckworth was sacked after a bad start to the following season. It proved to be his last role in club management.

He died in Sheffield in 1983, aged 76.

== Family ==
Duckworth was the son of professional footballer Dick Duckworth, who spent the majority of his career with Manchester United, and the nephew of fellow professional Dick Crawshaw, who played in the Football League with Manchester City, Halifax Town and Nelson.

== Honours ==
=== As a player ===
Chesterfield

- Third Division (North) Title winner: 1930–31

Chester City

- Welsh Cup winner: 1933

=== As a manager ===
Stockport County

- Cheshire Bowl winner: 1952–53, 1955–56

== Managerial statistics ==
Team	Nat	From	To	Record				
Team	Nat	From	To	G	W	L	D	Win %
York City	England	March 1950	October 1952	126	40	44	42	31.8
Stockport County	England	October 1952	May 1956	181	74	65	42	40.9
Darlington	England	October 1957	May 1960	139	50	56	33	36.0
Scunthorpe United	England	May 1960	November 1964	208	70	80	58	33.7
