= Tom Lockie =

Scottish footballer (1906–1977)

Personal information
- Full name: Thomas Lockie
- Date of birth: 13 January 1906
- Place of birth: Duns, Scotland
- Date of death: 27 July 1977 (aged 71)
- Place of death: New Earswick, England
- Height: 6 ft 0 in (1.83 m)
- Position: Defender

Senior career*
| Years | Team | Apps | (Gls) |
- Duns
- Rangers
- Leith Athletic
| | Barnsley | 14 | (1) |
| 1933–1934 | York City | 29 | (1) |
| | Accrington Stanley | 36 | (0) |
| | Mansfield Town | 14 | (1) |

Managerial career
- 1960–1967: York City
- * Club domestic league appearances and goals

Thomas Lockie (13 January 1906 – 27 July 1977) was a Scottish football player and manager. A defender, he played for Duns, Rangers, Leith Athletic, Barnsley, York City, Accrington Stanley and Mansfield Town.

He returned to York City in 1936 as reserve team coach and was promoted to first team trainer in 1937. He held this role for 23 years until becoming the manager in 1960, which he held until 1967.

== Managerial statistics ==
| Team | From | To | Record | | | | |
| Team | From | To | G | W | L | D | Win % |
|---|---|---|---|---|---|---|---|
| York City | 1 July 1960 | 31 October 1967 | 367 | 132 | 154 | 81 | 35.96 |
