= Wilf McGuinness =

English football player and manager (born 1937)

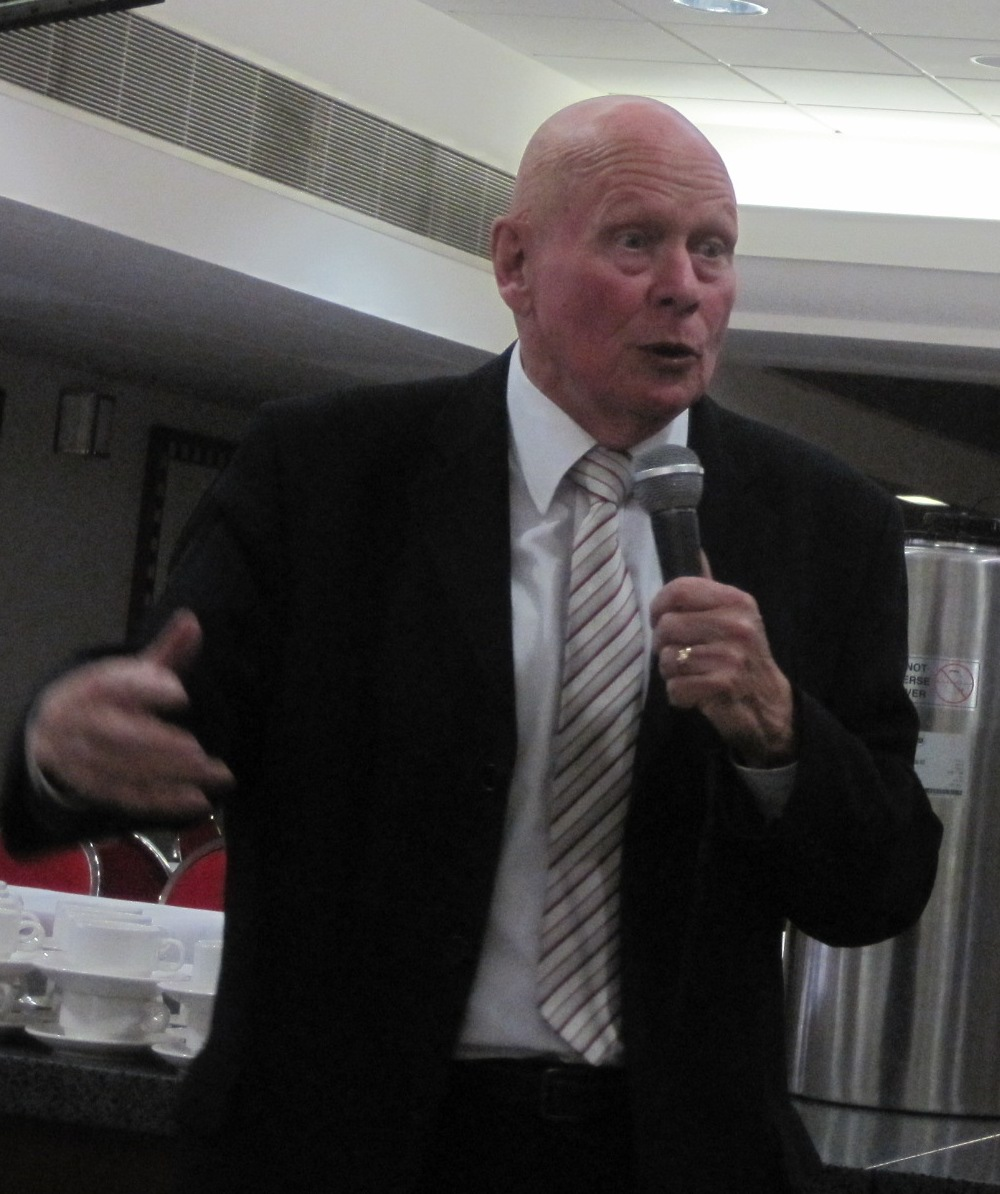
- McGuinness in 2013

Personal information
- Full name: Wilfred McGuinness
- Date of birth: 25 October 1937 (age 89)
- Place of birth: Manchester, England
- Position: Wing half

Youth career
- 1953–1954: Manchester United

Senior career*
Years	Team	Apps	(Gls)
1954–1959	Manchester United	81	(2)

International career
- England Schoolboys
	England Youth	4	(?)
	England U23	1	(?)
1958–1959	England	2	(0)

Managerial career
- 1969–1970: Manchester United
- 1971–1973: Aris
- 1973–1975: Panachaiki
- 1975–1977: York City
- 1978: Hull City (caretaker)
- 1989: Bury (caretaker)
- * Club domestic league appearances and goals

Wilfred McGuinness (born 25 October 1937) is an English former football player and manager who played for Manchester United and twice for England in his short playing career.

McGuinness succeeded Sir Matt Busby as manager of Manchester United in 1969. Following his tenure at the Manchester United bench, McGuinness had a four-year stay in Greece, leading Panachaiki through their first appearance in a European competition, the 1973–74 UEFA Cup.

McGuinness' son Paul was Manchester United's U18 team manager and assistant director of their youth academy for 17- to 21-year-olds.

== Playing career ==
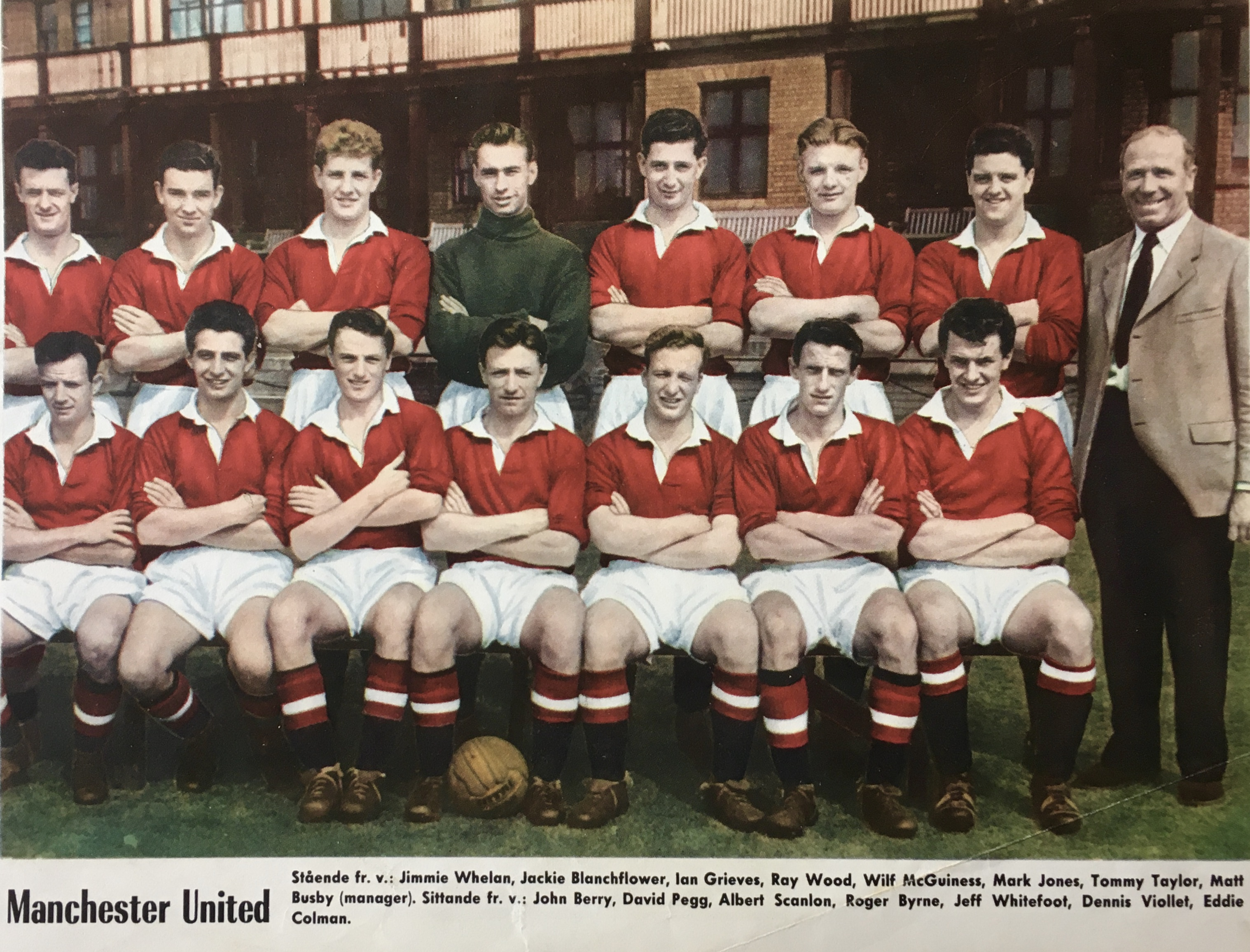
McGuinness (back row, fourth from the right) in a Manchester United team photo in 1957

As a player, McGuinness captained Manchester, Lancashire and England at schoolboy level, and signed for Manchester United in January 1953. He made his first team debut against Wolverhampton Wanderers on 8 October 1955, turning 18 later that month. Competition for places was fierce but he played in enough matches to qualify for a medal when United won the 1956–57 Football League.

McGuinness was still a United player at the time of the Munich air disaster in 1958, but an injury had prevented him from playing so he was not on the plane that crashed. A broken leg in the 1959–60 season finished his playing career when he was only 22, and came just after he had been capped twice at senior level by the England team.

== Managerial career ==
McGuinness continued to be involved at Manchester United after the end of his playing career, getting heavily involved in coaching, and in 1964 he replaced Jimmy Murphy as reserve team manager, as Murphy left that role after managing the reserve team to a sixth FA Youth Cup triumph. Due to him coaching players he had played with, he was advised to start smoking as a way of creating separation and asserting authority. In 1969, McGuinness was promoted from reserve team manager to manager of the first team after Matt Busby retired as manager at the end of the 1968–69 season. Appointed as Busby's successor in June 1969 at the age of 31, at a time when the Manchester United side was in transition and Busby had moved upstairs to become general manager, McGuinness's reign as Manchester United manager was not as successful as United had hoped. But McGuinness did lead United to three cup semi-finals during his reign, one in the FA Cup and two in the League Cup.

McGuinness was sacked in December 1970, after a dramatic comeback which saw United draw 4–4 with Derby County in a league fixture at the Baseball Ground. He returned to his old job as reserve team manager before leaving the club at the end of the season to become manager of Greek side Aris. Meanwhile, Busby was re-appointed as manager until the end of the season, following McGuinness' dismissal as first team manager, until Frank O'Farrell was named as Manchester United's new manager in June 1971.

Under McGuinness, Aris finished fourth in the 1971–72 Alpha Ethniki season, and ninth a year later, albeit being tied with three teams in sixth position. He took over Panachaiki in 1973, finishing sixth in the Alpha Ethniki his first year while advancing to the UEFA Cup second round in the team's first ever European campaign. Panachaiki finished seventh in the 1974–75 Alpha Ethniki season and parted with McGuinness.

In 1975, McGuinness was hired by York City. On arriving at York, he took over a side which had just recorded its highest-ever league finish, only to take them through two successive relegations before leaving midway through a season which ended with York having to apply for re-election to the Football League. Later he worked as assistant manager and then caretaker manager at Hull City, and was on the coaching staff at Bury for 10 years, taking over as interim manager prior to the appointment of Sam Ellis in 1989.

== Managerial statistics ==
Team	Nat	From	To	Record							
Team	Nat	From	To	G	W	D	L	GF	GA	GD	Win %
Manchester United	(England)	4 June 1969	29 December 1970	87	32	32	23	127	121	+6	36.78
Aris	(Greece)	1971	1973	74	35	20	19	102	65	+37	47.30
Panachaiki	(Greece)	1973	1975								
York City	(England)	February 1975	October 1977								

== Honours ==
=== Player ===
Manchester United

- Football League First Division: 1955–56, 1956–57
- FA Charity Shield: 1956, 1957
