= 1993 Football League Third Division play-off final =

Association football match

- The match took place at Wembley Stadium.
- Event: 1992–93 Football League Third Division
York City	Crewe Alexandra
1	1
- York City won 5–3 on penalties
- Date: 29 May 1993
- Venue: Wembley Stadium, London
- Referee: Allan Gunn (Sussex)
- Attendance: 22,416

The 1993 Football League Third Division play-off final was an association football match which was played on 29 May 1993 at Wembley Stadium, London, between York City and Crewe Alexandra. It was to determine the fourth and final team to gain promotion from the Football League Third Division to the Second Division. The top three teams of the 1992–93 Football League Third Division, Cardiff City, Wrexham and Barnet, gained automatic promotion to the Second Division, while those placed from fourth to seventh place in the table took part in play-offs. The winners of the play-off semi-finals competed for the final place for the 1993–94 season in the Second Division. The losing semi-finalists were Walsall and Bury who had been defeated by Crewe Alexandra and York City respectively.

Allan Gunn was the referee for the match which was played in front of an attendance of 22,416. After a 0–0 draw at full-time, the match went into extra time, and York took the lead through a Gary Swann goal. However, Dave McKearney scored a penalty kick after Steve Tutill was adjudged to have handled the ball a minute before the end of time so the match had to be resolved in a penalty shootout. York won the shoot-out 5–3, with Gareth Whalley's spot kick being saved by York City's goalkeeper Dean Kiely.

York City's next season saw them finish in fifth position in the Second Division and qualify for the play-offs where they lost in the semi-finals 1–0 on aggregate to Stockport County. Crewe Alexandra ended their following season in third place in the Third Division and gained automatic promotion to the Second Division for the 1994–95 season.

== Route to the final ==
Football League Third Division final table, leading positions
Pos	Team	Pld	W	D	L	GF	GA	GD	Pts
1	Cardiff City	42	25	8	9	77	47	+30	83
2	Wrexham	42	23	11	8	75	52	+23	80
3	Barnet	42	23	10	9	66	48	+18	79
4	York City	42	21	12	9	72	45	+27	75
5	Walsall	42	22	7	13	76	61	+15	73
6	Crewe Alexandra	42	21	7	14	75	56	+19	70
7	Bury	42	18	9	15	63	55	+8	63

York City finished the regular 1992–93 season in fourth position in the Third Division, the fourth tier of the English football league system, two places and five points ahead of Crewe Alexandra. Both therefore missed out on the three automatic places for promotion to the Second Division and instead took part in the play-offs to determine the fourth promoted team. York City finished four points behind Barnet (who were promoted in third place), five behind Wrexham (who were promoted in second place) and eight behind league winners Cardiff City.

York City's opponents in their play-off semi-final were Bury, with the first match of the two-legged tie being played at Gigg Lane in Bury on 16 May 1993. The York City goalkeeper Dean Kiely made a number of saves in the first half, including two shots from David Adekola and a header from Liam Robinson. After Kiely had made further saves from both Roger Stanislaus and Derek Ward, his Bury counterpart Gary Kelly twice prevented Paul Barnes from scoring and the match ended 0–0. The second leg took place three days later at Bootham Crescent in York. After a goalless first half, Gary Swann scored his first goal for York City with a header in the 59th minute to secure a 1–0 victory for his side and progression to the final with the same aggregate score.

Crewe Alexandra faced Walsall in the other semi-final with the first leg being held at Gresty Road in Crewe on 16 May 1993. In the 19th minute, Tony Naylor opened the scoring with a right-footed strike into the top-left corner of the Walsall goal. Seven minutes before half-time, a cross from Charlie Ntamark evaded Crewe defender Gus Wilson and was rolled into the Crewe goal by Mike Cecere to equalise for Walsall. Within a minute, Crewe retook the lead when a cross-field pass from Rob Edwards found Naylor who hit the ball beyond Mark Gayle to make it 2–1. Phil Clarkson extended Crewe's lead four minutes into the second half when he shot from close range after intercepting a Gareth Whalley backpass. A minute later Ashley Ward passed to Edwards who scored to make it 4–1. In the 84th minute, Naylor relayed Clarkson's pass to Ward who scored to make the final score 5–1. The second leg was played three days later at the Bescot Stadium in Walsall. Wayne Clarke gave the home side the lead in the 18th minute from their first corner but Crewe equalised in the 31st minute: Gayle saved an angled strike from Chris Marsh but the ball fell to Naylor who scored. Three minutes before half-time, Naylor scored his second after running onto a pass from Steve Walters and shooting from around 25 yards (23 m). With thirteen minutes of the match remaining, Naylor's shot from the left touchline struck the Walsall crossbar and Ward converted to make it 3–1. Martin O'Connor reduced the deficit the following minute with a 30-yard (27 m) strike but Naylor scored his third in the 88th minute and the match ended 4–2 to Crewe who progressed to the final with a 9–3 aggregate victory.

== Match ==
=== Background ===
Crewe Alexandra were making their second appearance in the play-offs having lost in the semi-finals the previous season 4–2 on aggregate to Scunthorpe United. They had played in the fourth tier of English football for the previous two seasons having been relegated there in the 1990–91 season. York City had not participated in the play-offs before this year and had played in the Third Division since relegation in the 1987–88 season. Both matches between the sides during the regular season ended in 3–1 home wins: York City were victorious in November 1992 at Bootham Crescent and Crewe Alexandra won at Gresty Road the following March. This was York City's first match at Wembley Stadium.

Alan Little had taken over from John Ward as manager of York City in March 1993 when Ward left to join Bristol Rovers. Little's older brother Brian was manager of Leicester City who were competing in the First Division play-off final two days later. The referee for the match was Allan Gunn. As both teams usually played in the same coloured kit, there was a coin toss to determine which side would wear their change strip: York won and wore red shirts while Crewe wore blue.

=== Summary ===
The match kicked off around 2:30 p.m. on 29 May 1993 at Wembley Stadium in front of a crowd of 22,416. Dave McKearney saw an early chance to score go wide of the York goal before Crewe goalkeeper Mark Smith held a shot from Jon McCarthy. Steve Walters then struck a shot after interplay between Naylor and Ward, but Kiely caught the ball. Mark Smith then caught a header from Ian Blackstone following a cross from Paul Atkin, before denying a cross-cum-shot from Barnes. A mistake from Crewe's Neil Lennon allowed Tony Canham to shoot from the edge of the penalty area but the attempt went over the crossbar. Swann then struck the ball over the Crewe goal before York's Wayne Hall prevented Ward from shooting. Towards the end of the first half, Crewe's Shaun Smith's 20-yard (18 m) strike went wide of the goal before Barnes struck an off-target shot. The half ended 0–0.

Neither side made any changes to their playing personnel during the interval and early in the second half, Canham once again took advantage of an error from Lennon but his shot was too high. Andy McMillan was then shown the yellow card for a foul on Naylor whose subsequent strike hit the post. In the 65th minute, Naylor had kicked the ball into the York net but it was disallowed as the linesman had flagged for offside. Five minutes later, Crewe made their first substitution of the game with Andy Woodward coming on to replace Edwards. Naylor then missed at further chances to score and in the last minute of regular time, McCarthy capitalised on a slip by Stewart Evans to run clear with the ball only to shoot over the Crewe crossbar and the game ended 0–0, sending the final into extra time.

Fourteen minutes into the first half of the additional period, Barnes flicked the ball onto Swann who ran onto it and struck it into the Crewe goal, according to Frank McGhee of The Observer, "as though scoring were the easiest thing in the world", making it 1–0 to York. Clarkson then came on for Walters in Crewe's second substitution. Three minutes into the second half, York made their first change with Paul Stancliffe being replaced by Steve Tutill. With a minute of extra time remaining, Tutill was adjudged to have handballed a cross from McKearney who scored the subsequent penalty to level the score at 1–1 and ensured the match was to be decided by a penalty shootout. York took the first of the penalties, and the first five spot kicks were converted. Whalley then saw his penalty saved by Kiely to his left-hand side. It was to be the only miss of the shootout and York won 5–3 to secure promotion to the Second Division.

=== Details ===
29 May 1993
14:30

York City	1–1 (a.e.t.)	Crewe Alexandra
Swann 104'	Report	McKearney 119' (pen.)
Penalties
McCarthy (penalty scored); Barnes (penalty scored); Canham (penalty scored); Pepper (penalty scored); Hall (penalty scored)	5–3	(penalty scored) McKearney; (penalty scored) S. Smith; (penalty missed) Whalley; (penalty scored) Ward

Wembley Stadium, London
Attendance: 22,416
Referee: Allan Gunn (Sussex)

GK	1	Dean Kiely
RB	2	Andy McMillan	(yellow card) 62'
LB	3	Wayne Hall
CM	4	Nigel Pepper	(yellow card) 95'
CB	5	Paul Atkin
CB	6	Paul Stancliffe (c)		(substituted off) 108'
RM	7	Jon McCarthy
LM	8	Tony Canham
CF	9	Paul Barnes
CM	10	Gary Swann
CF	11	Ian Blackstone
Substitutes:
DF	12	Steve Tutill		(substituted in) 108'
FW	14	John Borthwick
Manager:
Alan Little

GK	1	Mark Smith
RB	2	Dave McKearney
LB	3	Shaun Smith
CB	4	Stewart Evans (c)
CB	5	Darren Carr
CM	6	Gareth Whalley
CF	7	Ashley Ward
CF	8	Tony Naylor
CM	9	Neil Lennon
RM	10	Steve Walters	(substituted off) 104'
LM	11	Rob Edwards	(substituted off) 70'
Substitutes:
DF	12	Andy Woodward	(substituted in) 70'
MF	14	Phil Clarkson	(substituted in) 104'
Manager:
Dario Gradi

== Post-match ==
The Crewe manager Dario Gradi was convinced that Whalley was going to convert his penalty: "I would have put my house, even my mother's house, on him scoring". However, he was confident that Whalley would improve as a consequence of his experience: "I don't feel sorry for him, its part of being a professional footballer. In a way, he will benefit from this. It will make him tougher." The York City captain Stancliffe was one of the first people to commiserate with Whalley: "I told him that whatever I said was not going to help, but he had to keep his chin up and hope to get another crack next year. Having the opposition talk to him was probably the last thing he wanted, but you have to try."

York City's next season saw them finish in fifth position in the Second Division and qualify for the play-offs where they lost in the semi-finals 1–0 on aggregate to Stockport County. Crewe Alexandra ended their following season in third place in the Third Division and gained automatic promotion to the Second Division for the 1994–95 season.
