= 1992–93 York City F.C. season =

Association football club season

York City F.C.
1992–93 season
- Chairman: Douglas Craig
- Manager: John Ward (until 12 March 1993); Alan Little (from 12 March 1993)
- Ground: Bootham Crescent
- Football League Third Division: 4th
- Play-offs: Winners (promoted)
- FA Cup: First round (eliminated by Stockport County)
- League Cup: First round (eliminated by Chesterfield)
- Football League Trophy: Group stage
- Top goalscorer: League: Paul Barnes (21); All: Paul Barnes (21)
- Highest home attendance: 9,206 vs Bury, play-offs, 19 May 1993
- Lowest home attendance: 2,443 vs Shrewsbury Town, Third Division, 18 August 1992
- Average home league attendance: 3,946
Home colours

The 1992–93 season was the 71st season of competitive association football and 64th season in the Football League played by York City Football Club, a professional football club based in York, North Yorkshire, England. They finished in fourth position in the 22-team 1992–93 Football League Third Division, qualifying for the play-offs. They were successful in the final, beating Crewe Alexandra in a penalty shoot-out to gain promotion to the Football League Second Division.

They lost in the first rounds in both the 1992–93 FA Cup and 1992–93 Football League Cup, being knocked out by Stockport County and Chesterfield respectively, and failed to progress past the group stage of the 1992–93 Football League Trophy.

20 players made at least one appearance in nationally organised first-team competition, and there were 11 different goalscorers. Defenders Wayne Hall and Andy McMillan and midfielder Jon McCarthy played in all 50 first-team matches over the season. Paul Barnes finished as leading goalscorer with 21 goals, all scored in the league. The winner of the Clubman of the Year award was Paul Stancliffe.

== Match details ==
=== Football League Third Division ===
Football League Third Division match details
Date	League position	Opponents	Venue	Result	Score F–A	Scorers	Attendance
15 August 1992	6th	Shrewsbury Town	H	W	2–0	Warburton, Barnes	2,443
22 August 1992	3rd	Lincoln City	A	W	1–0	Barnes	3,032
29 August 1992	1st	Wrexham	H	W	4–0	Blackstone, Pepper pen., Borthwick, Barnes	2,554
1 September 1992	1st	Torquay United	H	W	2–1	Pepper pen., Warburton	3,365
5 September 1992	1st	Walsall	A	L	1–3	Warburton	3,574
12 September 1992	1st	Carlisle United	A	W	2–1	Pepper pen., McCarthy	5,355
15 September 1992	1st	Hereford United	H	W	4–2	Borthwick (2), Blackstone, McCarthy	3,672
19 September 1992	1st	Colchester United	H	W	2–0	Blackstone (2)	3,730
25 September 1992	1st	Darlington	A	W	1–0	Blackstone	3,787
3 October 1992	1st	Doncaster Rovers	H	D	1–1	Pepper pen.	4,611
10 October 1992	1st	Scunthorpe United	A	W	2–1	McCarthy, Pepper pen.	4,114
17 October 1992	1st	Rochdale	H	W	3–0	Barnes, Borthwick (2)	4,161
31 October 1992	1st	Bury	A	D	1–1	Borthwick	2,763
7 November 1992	1st	Barnet	H	W	2–0	Barnes, Pepper pen.	6,425
21 November 1992	1st	Northampton Town	A	L	3–4	Hall, Blackstone (2)	2,812
28 November 1992	1st	Crewe Alexandra	H	W	3–1	Atkin (2), Blackstone	4,190
12 December 1992	2nd	Chesterfield	H	D	0–0		3,382
19 December 1992	1st	Scarborough	A	L	2–4	Barnes, Canham	3,892
26 December 1992	1st	Cardiff City	A	D	3–3	Blackstone (2), Barnes	10,411
29 December 1992	2nd	Halifax Town	H	D	1–1	Barnes	4,068
9 January 1993	2nd	Hereford United	A	D	1–1	Borthwick	1,975
16 January 1993	2nd	Darlington	H	D	0–0		3,563
19 January 1993	2nd	Carlisle United	H	D	2–2	Borthwick, Barnes	3,071
22 January 1993	2nd	Colchester United	A	D	0–0		4,528
26 January 1993	3rd	Wrexham	A	L	0–3		6,894
30 January 1993	3rd	Lincoln City	H	W	2–0	Stancliffe, Canham	3,948
6 February 1993	2nd	Shrewsbury Town	A	D	1–1	Canham	3,532
13 February 1993	4th	Walsall	H	L	0–1		3,467
20 February 1993	4th	Torquay United	A	L	0–1		3,119
27 February 1993	4th	Scunthorpe United	H	W	5–1	Barnes (4), Blackstone	2,990
5 March 1993	2nd	Doncaster Rovers	A	W	1–0	Blackstone	3,188
9 March 1993	4th	Gillingham	H	D	1–1	Barnes	3,327
13 March 1993	3rd	Barnet	A	W	5–1	Barnes (3), Blackstone, opposition o.g.	4,985
20 March 1993	4th	Bury	H	L	1–2	McCarthy	3,985
23 March 1993	4th	Crewe Alexandra	A	L	1–3	McCarthy	3,381
26 March 1993	4th	Northampton Town	H	W	2–1	Canham, Blackstone	3,334
2 April 1993	2nd	Gillingham	A	W	4–1	Blackstone, Barnes (2), McCarthy	3,912
6 April 1993	3rd	Chesterfield	A	D	1–1	Barnes	3,850
10 April 1993	3rd	Cardiff City	H	W	3–1	McCarthy, Blackstone, Pepper	6,568
12 April 1993	2nd	Halifax Town	A	W	1–0	Barnes	3,983
17 April 1993	2nd	Scarborough	H	W	1–0	Pepper pen.	5,993
24 April 1993	3rd	Rochdale	A	L	0–1		3,920

=== League table (part) ===
Final Football League Third Division table (part)
Pos	Club	Pld	W	D	L	F	A	GD	Pts
2nd	Wrexham	42	23	11	8	75	52	+23	80
3rd	Barnet	42	23	10	9	66	48	+18	79
4th	York City	42	21	12	9	72	45	+27	75
5th	Walsall	42	22	7	13	76	61	+15	73
6th	Crewe Alexandra	42	21	7	14	75	56	+19	70
Key	Pos = League position; Pld = Matches played; W = Matches won; D = Matches drawn; L = Matches lost; F = Goals for; A = Goals against; GD = Goal difference; Pts = Points								
Source									

=== FA Cup ===
FA Cup match details
Round	Date	Opponents	Venue	Result	Score F–A	Scorers	Attendance
First round	14 November 1992	Stockport County	H	L	1–3	Canham	5,640

=== League Cup ===
League Cup match details
Round	Date	Opponents	Venue	Result	Score F–A	Scorers	Attendance
First round first leg	18 August 1992	Chesterfield	A	L	0–2		2,080
First round second leg	25 August 1992	Chesterfield	H	D	0–0; 0–2 agg.		2,336

=== Football League Trophy ===
Football League Trophy match details
Round	Date	Opponents	Venue	Result	Score F–A	Scorers	Attendance
Group stage	1 December 1992	Doncaster Rovers	A	L	1–2	Canham	1,419
Group stage	8 December 1992	Hull City	H	D	0–0		2,253

=== Football League Third Division play-offs ===
Football League Third Division play-offs match details
Round	Date	Opponents	Venue	Result	Score F–A	Scorers	Attendance
Semi-final first leg	16 May 1993	Bury	A	D	0–0		6,620
Semi-final second leg	19 May 1993	Bury	H	W	1–0; 1–0 agg.	Swann	9,206
Final	29 May 1993	Crewe Alexandra	N	D	1–1 a.e.t. 5–3 pens.	Swann	22,416

== Appearances and goals ==
Numbers in parentheses denote appearances as substitute.
Players with names struck through and marked † left the club during the playing season.
Players with names in italics and marked * were on loan from another club for the whole of their season with York.
Key to positions: GK – Goalkeeper; DF – Defender; MF – Midfielder; FW – Forward

Players having played at least one first-team match
Pos.	Nat.	Name	League		FA Cup		League Cup		FLT		Play-offs		Total	
Pos.	Nat.	Name	Apps	Goals	Apps	Goals	Apps	Goals	Apps	Goals	Apps	Goals	Apps	Goals
GK	ENG	Dean Kiely	40	0	0	0	2	0	1	0	3	0	46	0
GK	ENG	~~Chris Marples~~ †	2	0	1	0	0	0	1	0	0	0	4	0
DF	ENG	Paul Atkin	28 (3)	2	1	0	0	0	2	0	3	0	34 (3)	2
DF	ENG	Wayne Hall	42	1	1	0	2	0	2	0	3	0	50	1
DF	RSA	Andy McMillan	42	0	1	0	2	0	2	0	3	0	50	0
DF	ENG	Paul Stancliffe	41	1	1	0	1	0	2	0	3	0	48	1
DF	ENG	Steve Tutill	6 (2)	0	0	0	1	0	0	0	0 (1)	0	7 (3)	0
DF	ENG	Ray Warburton	9 (1)	3	0	0	2	0	0	0	0	0	11 (1)	3
MF	ENG	Tony Barratt	4 (6)	0	0	0	0	0	0	0	0	0	4 (6)	0
MF	ENG	Steve Bushell	8	0	0	0	0	0	2	0	0	0	10	0
MF	ENG	Tony Canham	16 (13)	4	1	1	1	0	0 (1)	1	3	0	21 (14)	6
MF	ENG	Scott Jordan	0 (1)	0	1	0	0	0	0	0	0	0	1 (1)	0
MF	ENG	Jon McCarthy	42	7	1	0	2	0	2	0	3	0	50	7
MF	ENG	Nigel Pepper	34	8	0	0	2	0	0	0	3	0	39	8
MF	ENG	Gary Swann	38	0	1	0	2	0	2	0	3	2	46	2
FW	ENG	Paul Barnes	40	21	1	0	2	0	1	0	3	0	47	21
FW	ENG	Ian Blackstone	37 (2)	16	0	0	1 (1)	0	2	0	3	0	43 (3)	16
FW	ENG	John Borthwick	28 (5)	8	1	0	2	0	2	0	0 (1)	0	33 (6)	8
FW	ENG	Glenn Naylor	1 (3)	0	0	0	0 (1)	0	0 (1)	0	0	0	1 (5)	0
FW	ENG	Darren Tilley	4 (2)	0	0	0	0	0	1	0	0	0	5 (2)	0

== See also ==
- List of York City F.C. seasons
