= History of York City F.C. (1980–present) =

History of an English football club

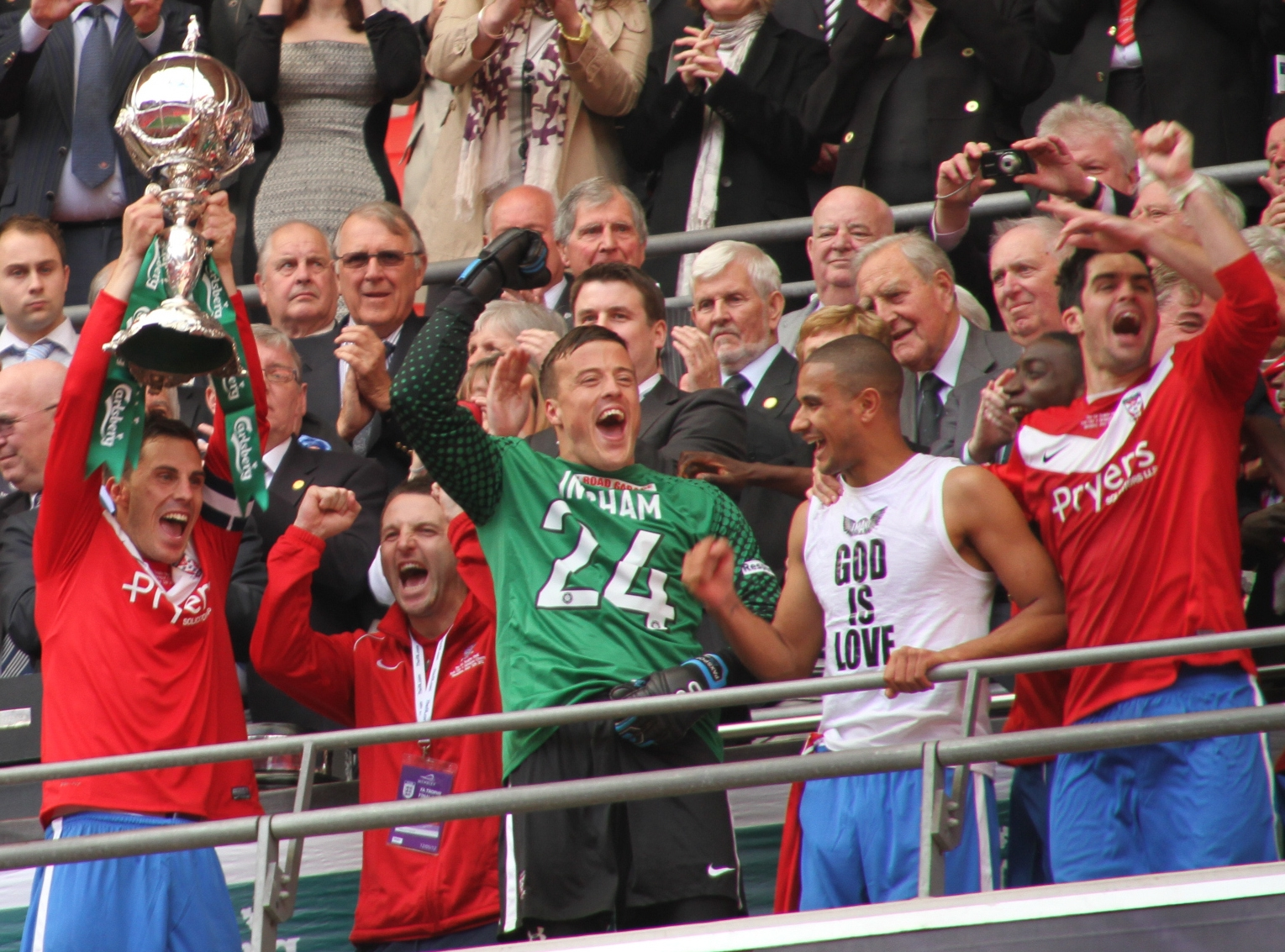
York City players after the club's victory at Wembley Stadium in the 2012 FA Trophy final

York City Football Club is a professional association football club based in York, North Yorkshire, England. Its history from the 1980–81 to the current season saw fluctuating fortunes in the 1980s and 1990s, and relegations from the Football League.

York made their seventh re-election bid after 1980–81, before the club won its first and only league title after finishing first in the Fourth Division in 1983–84 with 101 points. They were the first team to obtain 100+ points in a Football League season. After four seasons in the Third Division, York were relegated in 1987–88, statistically the club's worst Football League season. They beat Crewe Alexandra on penalties at Wembley Stadium in the play-off final in 1992–93, winning promotion back to the third tier of English football, now renamed as the Second Division. The following season, York competed in the play-off semi-final, when they were beaten by Stockport County. Later in the 1990s, they knocked Premier League teams Manchester United and Everton out of the League Cup in successive seasons. After six seasons, York were relegated to the Third Division in 1998–99. In the following years, the club experienced financial troubles; chairman Douglas Craig offered the club and its ground for sale in December 2001.

The club was bought by John Batchelor in March 2002, but the following December they went into administration. In March 2003, York were taken over by the Supporters' Trust, and were relegated to the Conference National in 2003–04, ending 75 years of Football League membership. The team were unsuccessful in the play-offs in the 2006–07 and 2009–10 seasons, and were beaten at the newly rebuilt Wembley Stadium in the 2009 FA Trophy final. In 2011–12, York defeated Newport County at Wembley Stadium in the 2012 FA Trophy final, and shortly after returned to the Football League with a win over Luton Town in the play-off final. In their second season in League Two, the club reached the play-offs but were knocked out in the semi-final by Fleetwood Town. After four years back in the Football League, York were relegated to the National League in 2015–16. They were relegated to the National League North the following season, but won the FA Trophy after beating Macclesfield Town in the 2017 final.

== 1980–1998: Fourth Division championship and first play-off success ==
York's league positions since the 1929–30 season

The 1980–81 season started comfortably for York City, and the team were 14th in the table by mid January 1981. However, 3 wins from the last 18 matches saw them finish in bottom place. York's seventh application for re-election was successful with 46 votes. Poor form at home contributed to York occupying the bottom half of the table for most of 1981–82, with a club record of 12 successive home matches without a win set. Barry Lyons was dismissed as manager in December 1981, and the club dropped into the bottom four under the caretaker management of Kevin Randall. Former York player and club director Barry Swallow took over as caretaker manager in March 1982, and several convincing home wins toward the end of the season helped the team to 17th place. Denis Smith, who had played on loan from Stoke City the previous season, was appointed player-manager in May 1982, with Viv Busby as his assistant player-coach. York finished 1982–83 in seventh place; their inconsistent away form in the last half of the season led to them missing out on promotion. The club occupied one of the top two places in 1983–84 from the second week of the season onwards, and won the Fourth Division championship with 101 points. They became the first team to achieve a three-figure points total in a Football League season. The Yorkshire Evening Press billed them the "Team of the Century". York set new club records for most wins (31), most away wins (13) and most goals (91). For the first time since 1954–55, York had two players score over 20 league goals in a season; these were John Byrne and Keith Walwyn. A profit of almost £15,000 was posted and the club aspired to further progress and promotion.

Winning six of their first eight matches in 1984–85, York were top of the Third Division by early October 1984. After a run of 2 wins from 11 matches, they slipped to 11th place in mid December 1984, though they continued to occupy a top half position before finishing the season in eighth place. In January 1985, York beat First Division team Arsenal 1–0 at home in the FA Cup fourth round, courtesy of a late penalty scored by Keith Houchen. They reached the fifth round for the third time and drew 1–1 at home to European Cup holders Liverpool. They lost 7–0 in the replay at Anfield—the club's record cup defeat. York started 1985–86 well and were second in the table by late November 1985, before a poor midseason spell saw them drop into midtable. After being unbeaten in the last nine matches, they finished seventh in the table, marking the fifth consecutive season in which York's end-of-season league placing improved. They reached the FA Cup fifth round for the second consecutive season, again drawing 1–1 at home to Liverpool, before losing 3–1 after extra time at Anfield. York made a strong start to 1986–87, and in late September 1986 they were in second place. They won only 7 of their remaining 38 matches and needed a point from their last match to avoid the danger of relegation, which they achieved with a 1–1 draw against Notts County. York finished 1986–87 in 20th place.

Smith left to take over at Sunderland in May 1987, and former Blackburn Rovers manager Bobby Saxton was appointed in June. Only two players were under contract at the time of Saxton's arrival; his hastily arranged squad struggled from the start of 1987–88, and only won their first match in late October 1987. York were bottom of the table for most of the season, and were relegated after finishing in 23rd place. The season was statistically the club's worst in the Football League, with the fewest wins (8), most defeats (29) and the fewest points since the three points for a win system was introduced (33). York made a poor start to 1988–89, and Saxton resigned with the club bottom of the Fourth Division in mid September 1988. Swallow took over on a caretaker basis before the former Hartlepool United manager John Bird was appointed in October 1988. York's away form improved in the second half of the season, and in the last week they had a slim chance of reaching the play-offs. They missed out on a play-off place and finished the season in 11th place. A record loss of £190,000 was posted for the season, but the club carried no overdraft because of interest-free loans from directors and a £100,000 share issue. York started 1989–90 strongly and were in third place by mid December 1989. Successive home defeats in late December 1989 marked the start of a decline that saw them finish the season 13th in the table.

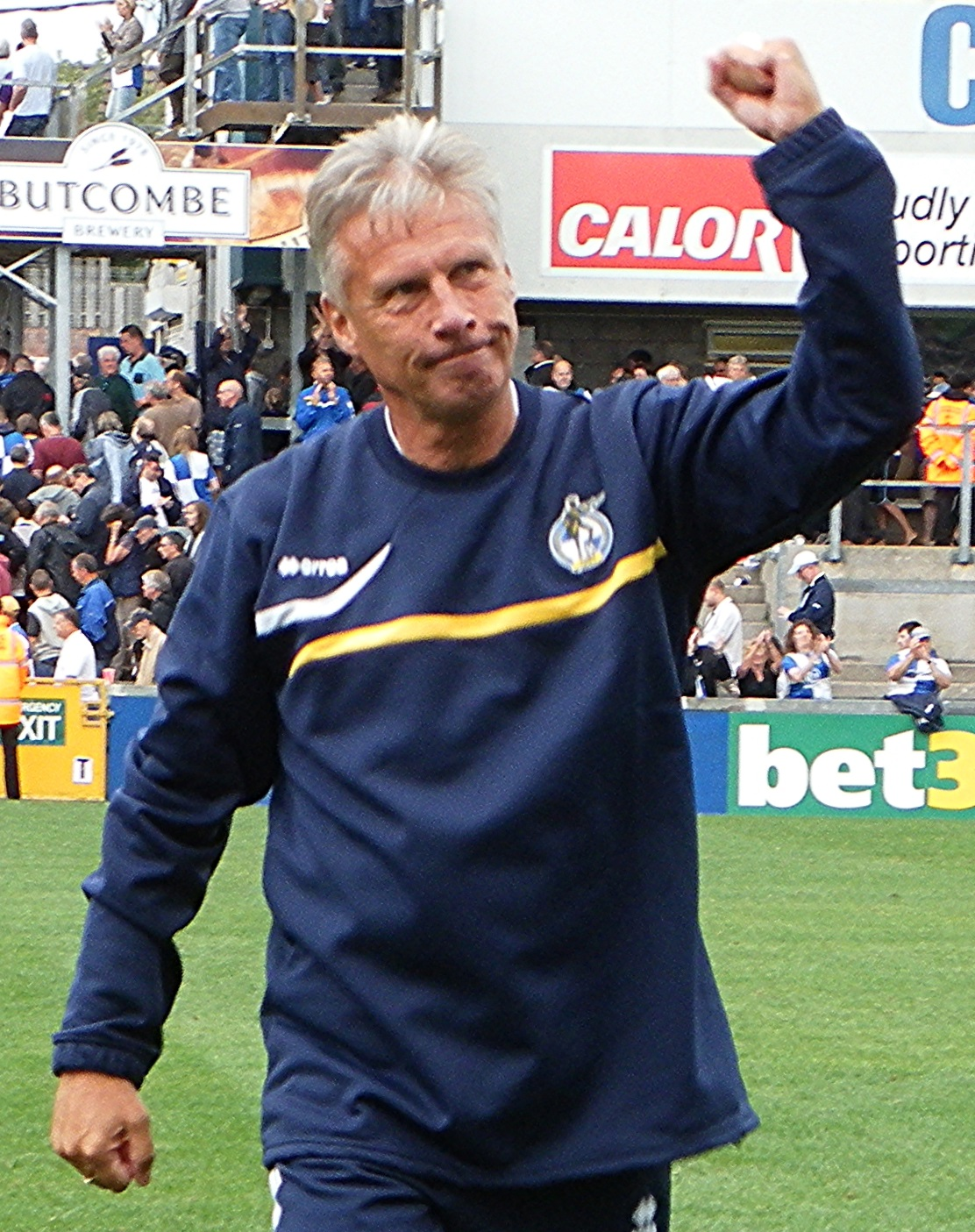
John Ward left York late into the 1992–93 season, which culminated in promotion via the Third Division play-offs.

In September 1990, York player David Longhurst collapsed and died after suffering heart failure during a home match against Lincoln City. A few months later, a newly built, covered stand at the Shipton Street End of Bootham Crescent was named after him. York were the Fourth Division's second lowest scorers in 1990–91, as they finished 21st in the table. Douglas Craig, who had been on the board since 1978, succeeded Michael Sinclair as chairman in June 1991. York had won 2 of 11 matches by mid October 1991; Bird was dismissed and was replaced in November by Aston Villa assistant manager John Ward. York continued to be placed in lower midtable, and finished fourth from bottom for the second year running in 1991–92. They started 1992–93 with a club-record start of four wins, and led the table until late December 1992. Ward left for Bristol Rovers in March 1993, shortly after a midseason slump in which York won only 1 of 13 matches. Ward's assistant Alan Little took over and York finished the season in fourth place. They played Bury in the play-off semi-final, drawing the first leg 0–0 at Gigg Lane before winning the second leg 1–0 at home with a goal from Gary Swann. In the final at Wembley Stadium, York beat Crewe Alexandra 5–3 on penalties, after the score had finished 1–1 after extra time. Wayne Hall scored the decisive penalty as York won promotion to the third tier, now named the Second Division after the formation of the Premier League in 1992.

York made a good start to 1993–94, before a series of poor results saw them slip to 17th place in late November 1993. They lost only 5 of their last 30 fixtures to finish the season fifth in the Second Division table—their highest league placing since 1976. They lost to Stockport County in the play-off semi-final, being beaten 1–0 in the second leg at Edgeley Park after drawing 0–0 at home in the first leg. York were in lower midtable for the first half of 1994–95, but improving form saw them move up the table, before finishing in ninth place. They struggled through most of 1995–96, and only avoided relegation by winning their last match away to Brighton & Hove Albion; they finished in 20th place. This season saw York record a 4–3 aggregate victory over Manchester United in the League Cup second round. York defeated a strong United team including some younger players 3–0 at Old Trafford in the first leg; in the second leg, United fielded some more experienced players, and despite losing 3–1, York progressed on aggregate. United went on to win the Premier League and FA Cup double. York finished 20th in 1996–97, only securing safety in the penultimate match with an away win over Rotherham United. For the second consecutive season, they eliminated Premier League opponents from the League Cup in the second round, with a 4–3 aggregate win over Everton. After drawing the first leg 1–1 at Goodison Park, York progressed after winning the second leg 3–2 at home. In mid December 1997, York were fourth in the table, but declining form after New Year saw them finish 1997–98 in 16th place.

== 1998–2010: Financial problems and relegation from Football League ==
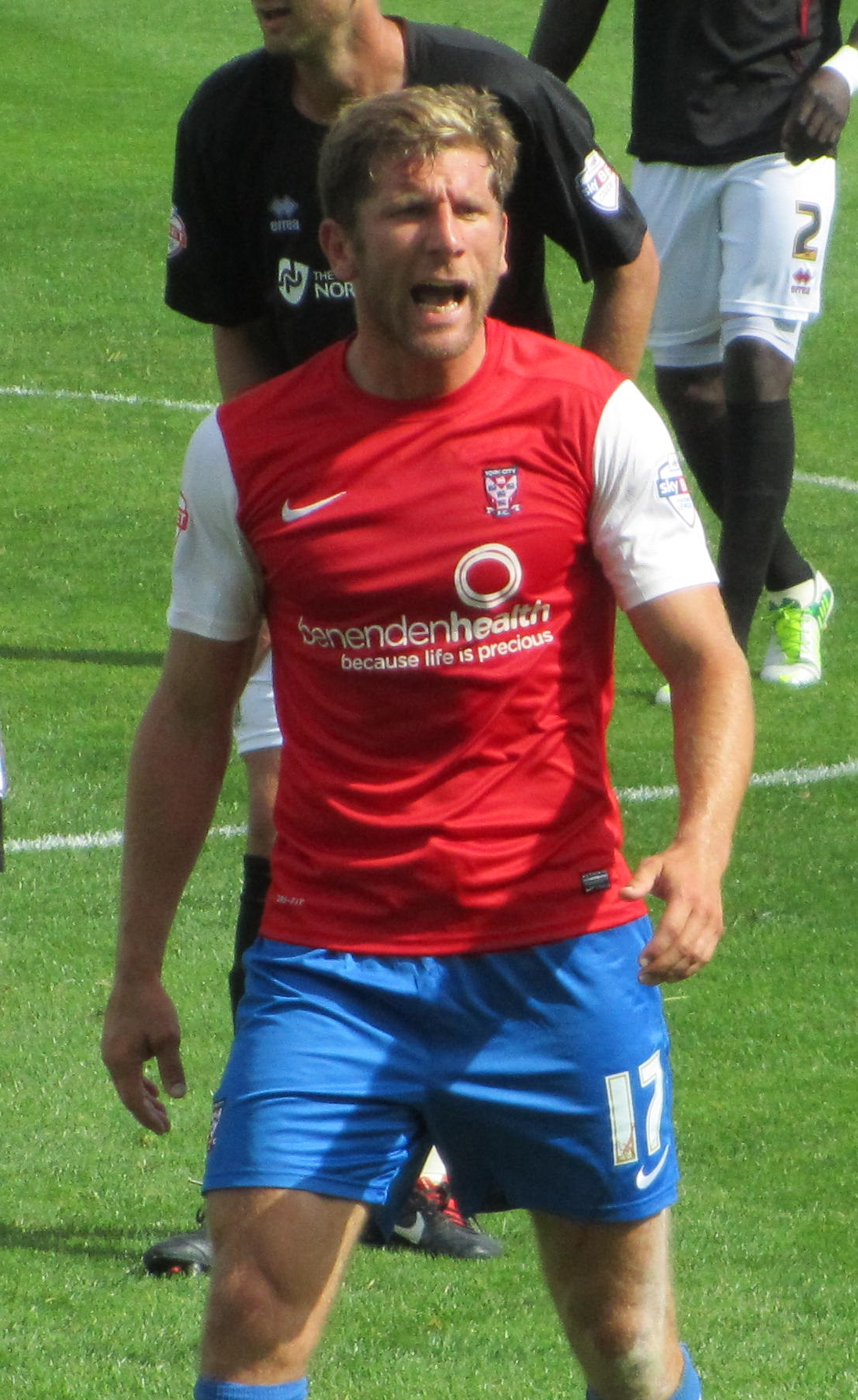
Richard Cresswell was sold to Sheffield Wednesday in 1999 for a club-record fee of £950,000.

By mid October 1998, York were placed eighth in the Second Division. They slipped to the bottom third of the table after winning 1 point from a possible 21. Despite improved results over Christmas, York played 11 consecutive matches without a win. In mid March 1999, the club was just above the bottom four places, when Little was dismissed and player-coach Neil Thompson appointed caretaker manager. A flurry of transfers, including the departure of leading scorer Richard Cresswell to Premier League club Sheffield Wednesday for a club-record fee of £950,000, followed. After losing away to Manchester City on the last day of 1998–99, York dropped into the bottom four for the first time that season, and were relegated in 21st place. The club's trading loss for the season was £483,096, despite a record profit of £1,274,202 from lucrative transfers. Club historian David Batters said, "the stark reality was that the club had to sell to survive". In July 1999, the club and its real property assets, including the ground, were transferred to a holding company called Bootham Crescent Holdings (BCH) for £165,000. Thompson was dismissed in February 2000 after a run of 1 win from 12 matches during the middle of 1999–2000. Former Hull City manager Terry Dolan took over, and York finished the season in 20th place after conceding only 5 goals in the last 12 matches. Losses for the season were £667,255, and the wage bill of £1,635,736 was twice that of 1995.

By mid February 2001, York were bottom of the Third Division table, but after losing only 2 of their last 16 matches they finished 2000–01 in 17th. They reached the FA Cup third round for the second time since 1986, but were beaten 3–0 by Premier League team Leicester City at Filbert Street. Record losses of £1,261,038 were reported in November 2001, before Craig announced in December that the club and the ground had been put up for sale for £4.5 million. Craig later said Bootham Crescent would close by June 2002, and the club would resign from the Football League if a buyer was not found. The club was taken over by motor racing driver John Batchelor in March 2002. He pledged to give the Supporters' Trust (ST) two seats on the board and announced a sponsorship deal with Persimmon that would see an undisclosed amount split between the club and his racing team. By late March 2002, York were second from bottom, before a run of five wins from the last eight matches saw them finish 2001–02 in 14th place. They reached the FA Cup fourth round for the first time since 1986, losing 2–0 at home to Premier League team Fulham.

In May 2002, the club was rebranded York City Soccer Club as part of Batchelor's plan to market it in the United States. Persimmon, which had bought 10% of the shares in BCH, submitted planning applications for 93 homes on the site of Bootham Crescent, and Batchelor spoke of building York a new stadium at Clifton Moor. The club entered a creditors' voluntary agreement in November 2002, and the York Evening Press said York had been "plunged into the darkest, coldest days of its history". The club went into administration in December 2002, and was given five weeks to find a buyer or face bankruptcy. The ST donated £92,000 to give the club a temporary reprieve. The ST took control over the club in March 2003 after the Inland Revenue accepted an offer of £100,000 as payment for £160,000 owed in tax. Steve Beck became the new chairman. Batchelor had diverted almost all of the £400,000 Persimmon sponsorship money away from York to his racing team, and his promise of having ST members on the board never materialised. He left the club with a profit of £120,000 and admitted to asset stripping during his time as owner. Despite the off-field problems, York pushed for promotion in 2002–03 and were in an automatic promotion place by late March 2003. They won none of their last six matches and finished the season in 10th place.

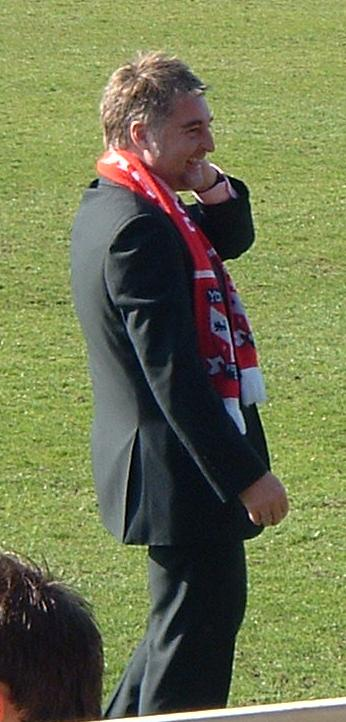
Jason McGill became the club's managing director in 2004.

Dolan was dismissed in May 2003, the new board citing financial reasons for his departure. At 27 years, York player Chris Brass was appointed player-manager in June 2003, which made him the youngest Football League managerial appointment since 1946. The club's lease of Bootham Crescent was extended to May 2004, and plans proceeded to develop Huntington Stadium ahead of a possible move, but problems bringing the ground to Football League standards were encountered. The board preferred to stay at Bootham Crescent, and they bought the site in February 2004 after six months of negotiations. The deal came after York were lent £2 million by The Football Stadia Improvement Fund (FSIF), with which they bought 75.89% of BCH shares and all of the 20,000 shares owned by Persimmon. Once plans for a new stadium were settled, the loan would be converted a grant to help fund the move. York equalled a club record by winning the first four matches of 2003–04, and by mid January 2004 were 10th in the table. They won none of their final 20 fixtures, garnering only five more points as they finished bottom of the Third Division. York were relegated to the Conference National after 75 years of Football League membership. Beck renounced his title of chairman in September 2004 because he favoured a more democratic approach for a fan-owned club. The board was restructured and Jason McGill became the managing director.

In November 2004, Brass was dismissed after a home defeat to Forest Green Rovers, which left York fourth from the bottom of the table. His assistant Viv Busby took over as caretaker manager before former Derby County coach Billy McEwan was appointed in February 2005. Under McEwan, York avoided relegation to the Conference North, with a 17th-place finish in 2004–05. One-third into 2005–06, York were in second place but poor midseason results saw them slide down the table. They pushed for the play-offs after six consecutive wins but finished in eighth place after faltering in the run-in. With 22 goals, Andy Bishop was the Conference National top scorer in 2005–06. Financial problems arose again; a loss of £150,000 was reported for the season, and there were problems meeting the first annual payment of £100,000 to the FSIF. McGill's company JM Packaging made a proposal to the ST to become majority shareholders, and would lend the club £650,000 to cover the current losses and meet the loan repayments for the next five years. ST members approved the proposal in June 2006, and JM Packaging became 75% shareholders, reducing the ST's previous 85% ownership to 25%. York made a good start to 2006–07, and were never out of the top five from early November 2006. They finished the season in fourth place and played Morecambe in the play-off semi-final; after drawing 0–0 at home in the first leg, they were beaten 2–1 at Christie Park in the second leg.

York started 2007–08 by losing 7 of their first 10 matches. Despite improving form, their home results remained poor, leading to McEwan's dismissal in November 2007. He was succeeded by his assistant Colin Walker, after the team won five of his six matches as caretaker manager. York finished the season in 14th place, and reached the semi-final of the FA Trophy, losing 2–1 on aggregate to Torquay United. In May 2008, City of York Council announced its commitment to build a community stadium, to be used by York and the city's rugby league club, York City Knights. An agreement with the FSIF was reached in September 2008; the club would stop making loan repayments and would repay the outstanding amount once Bootham Crescent was sold. At the start of 2008–09, York won only 5 of their 19 league matches, resulting in Walker's dismissal in November 2008. Under his replacement, former Port Vale manager Martin Foyle, the team avoided relegation in the penultimate match of the season against Weymouth, and they finished 17th in the table. York participated in the 2009 FA Trophy final at the newly rebuilt Wembley Stadium, where they were beaten 2–0 by Stevenage Borough. After starting 2009–10 with only one win from five matches, York won eight successive matches in a bid for promotion. They finished in fifth place and faced Luton Town in the play-off semi-final, winning each leg 1–0. However, they were beaten 3–1 by Oxford United at Wembley Stadium in the final. They reached the FA Cup third round that season, and were beaten 3–1 by Premier League team Stoke City at the Britannia Stadium. Richard Brodie was the Conference Premier joint top scorer in 2009–10, with 26 goals.

== 2010–present: Return to and relegation from Football League ==
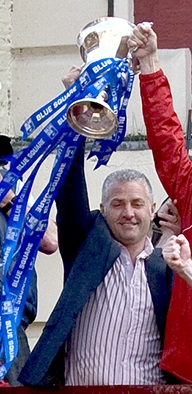
Gary Mills led York to promotion to League Two after they won the 2012 Conference Premier play-off final.

After winning only 3 of their first 10 matches of 2010–11, Foyle resigned as manager in September 2010, and was replaced with Tamworth manager Gary Mills the following month. Improving form saw York challenge for the play-offs, and by mid March 2011 they were sixth in the table—one place away from a play-off spot. They won only 3 of 10 matches in the run-in and missed out on the play-offs to finish the season in eighth place. York reached the FA Cup third round for the second consecutive year, and lost 2–0 to Premier League team Bolton Wanderers at the Reebok Stadium. York won three of the opening seven matches in 2011–12 and were only once below a play-off place from early October 2011, finishing the season in fourth place. Playing a passing style of football but producing results when needed, they earned 83 points that season—the second highest in the club's history. York drew 1–1 at home to Mansfield Town in the play-off semi-final first leg and won the second leg 1–0 after extra time at Field Mill. They then beat Newport County 2–0 at Wembley Stadium in the 2012 FA Trophy final, which was the first time the club had won a national knockout competition. A week later, they returned to Wembley Stadium for the play-off final, beating Luton Town 2–1, with goals from Ashley Chambers and Matty Blair. The club was promoted to League Two, returning to the Football League after an eight-year absence. In between the two matches, City of York Council granted planning permission for a new community stadium to be built at Monks Cross.

York started 2012–13 by winning 4 of 14 matches, and were ninth in the table by late October 2012. They dropped down the table in the following months, but were still in contention for a play-off place after beating Burton Albion 3–0 in the New Year. After this match, York failed to win in 11 consecutive matches, and Mills was dismissed in March 2013 after a 2–0 home defeat to Bradford City. Under his replacement, former Northern Ireland manager Nigel Worthington, York avoided relegation by winning four of their last five matches. They finished their first League Two season in 17th place. York won only 4 of their first 23 matches of 2013–14, and were third from the bottom of the table by late December 2013. A number of influential signings in January 2014 helped York improve their form, and from early February they were unbeaten in 17 consecutive matches, conceding no goals from open play. York finished in seventh place and played Fleetwood Town in the play-off semi-final. After losing the first leg 1–0 at home, York drew 0–0 at Highbury Stadium in the second leg. Worthington resigned as manager in October 2014 after York won only 1 of their opening 14 matches of 2014–15. He was succeeded by former Scunthorpe United manager Russ Wilcox. York remained in the lower reaches of the table. They avoided relegation with a late-season run of four wins from five matches, finishing the season in 18th place.

With York 21st in the table after a nine-match run without a league win, Wilcox was dismissed in October 2015. He was succeeded in November 2015 by the former Dundee United manager Jackie McNamara. York won only another five matches in 2015–16, and were relegated to the National League in bottom place. This heralded the end of a four-year return in the Football League, and Dave Flett of The Press argued that McNamara would "always be held most accountable for the second-worst campaign, points wise, in the club's 94-year history". In October 2016, Gary Mills returned as manager, shortly after his dismissal by Wrexham. York were 19th in the table, after starting 2016–17 with only 3 wins from 15 matches. They spent much of the coming months in the relegation zone, before Mills' rebuilt squad went on a run of six wins from nine matches to be above the relegation zone with three fixtures remaining. However, York were relegated to the National League North for the first time on the last day of the season, after a 2–2 home draw with Forest Green Rovers. They finished in 21st place, one point from safety. However, York won the FA Trophy for the second time in 2016–17, beating Macclesfield Town 3–2 at Wembley Stadium in the 2017 final.

Following a defeat to South Shields in the FA Cup third qualifying round, Mills was dismissed as York's manager. They were seventh in the National League North, 11 points from the only automatic promotion place. His replacement was Martin Gray, transferring from York's divisional rivals Darlington. In 2021, the Minstermen moved into the York Community Stadium, playing their first match at the new ground on 16 February 2021.

In the 2021–22 season, York finished the season in 5th place, qualifying for the play-offs. The club had previously been mid-table before Steve Watson was sacked and replaced by John Askey in March 2022. The Minstermen defeated Chorley by 2–1 in the play-off quarter-final before beating Brackley Town in the semi-final. York were promoted after defeating Boston United 2–0 in the play-off final to return to the fifth tier thanks to goals by Lenell John-Lewis and Maziyar Kouhyar. The ST purchased JM Packaging's 75% share of the club in July 2022 to regain its 100% shareholding, before transferring 51% of those shares to businessman Glen Henderson, who took over as chairman of the club.

In November 2022, Askey was sacked, which was described by The Press as a shock decision with the club in 12th place in the National League. Both Henderson and Askey confirmed that there had been off-field disagreements between the pair prior to the dismissal. York would be dragged into a relegation battle following Askey's departure and only narrowly survived in 19th place, three points above the relegation zone. At the end of the season, 394 Sports Ltd (led by the Uggla family) acquired a 51% majority stake of the football club.
