= McKearney =

McKearney is a surname. Notable people with the surname include:

- Dave McKearney (born 1968), English footballer
- Pádraig McKearney (1954–1987), Marxist-oriented Provisional Irish Republican Army volunteer
- Tommy McKearney (born 1952), Irish Republican, socialist, former hunger striker, and volunteer in the Provisional Irish Republican Army
