= Andy McMillan (soccer) =

South African soccer player and coach

Personal information
- Full name: Lyndon Andre McMillan
- Date of birth: 22 June 1968 (age 58)
- Place of birth: Bloemfontein, South Africa
- Height: 5 ft 11 in (1.80 m)
- Position: Defender

Senior career*
Years	Team	Apps	(Gls)
1987–1999	York City	421	(5)
1999–2000	Ayr United	19	(0)
2001	Nestlé Rowntree		
2001	Pickering Town		
2004–2007	Haxby United		
Total		440	(5)

Managerial career
- 2008: Haxby United
- * Club domestic league appearances and goals

Lyndon Andre "Andy" McMillan (born 22 June 1968) is a South African former professional footballer and coach who played as a defender. He spent most of his career at York City, where he is second highest in the appearance records.

== Playing career ==
McMillan was born in Bloemfontein and lived in South Africa until he was 12 when his family moved to Bulawayo, Zimbabwe, living there for six years and playing junior international football for Zimbabwe. Eager to forge a career as a professional in the Football League, McMillan spent six weeks in England trialling with both Tottenham Hotspur and Hull City before returning to Zimbabwe to sit his school examinations. His parents, Trevor and Ann, returned to live in England in the Hull area in 1986 and McMillan signed non-contract terms with Hull City. After rejecting a further deal with the club he played Sunday league football for Northwood & St. Peter's in the Hull Sunday League, before receiving offers from Preston North End and York City, agreeing to join the latter club. He would stay at York for 11 years at right back, eventually becoming the club's second all-time top appearances maker under the management of Alan Little.

The 1992–93 season saw him chosen by fellow league professionals as the best right back in the Third Division, the same season York won promotion via the Division Three play-offs. The club played in Second Division the following year, and managed to reach the semi-finals of the play-offs, but were not victorious.

McMillan played in York's 3–0 victory against Premier League side Manchester United in the League Cup in 1995, and against Everton in the 3–2 win during 1996 in the League Cup, which were two of the club's most famous giant killings.

In all competitions, McMillan played 492 times for York. At the North Yorkshire club he was a highly popular figure, but was forced out by the chairman Douglas Craig in 1999 before he could reach 500 appearances, much to the dismay of the club's fans.

After leaving York, McMillan would briefly play with Scottish side Ayr United before retiring from professional football in 2000. He did however return to the game in non-League football with West Yorkshire Association Football League side Nestlé Rowntree a year later, making his debut in a 6–0 victory over Whitkirk Wanderers in April 2001. After playing for them in pre-season McMillan signed for Pickering Town in August. He joined York Football League club Haxby United for 2004–05, debuting in the 3–2 victory away to Malton and Old Malton on 25 August 2004. He remained with the club, before retiring at the end of 2006–07.

== Coaching career ==
Once retired from the professional game, he went on to work for the software firm Phoenix Software before becoming an estate agent in York. He now runs his own aggregates company delivering building materials. In July 2005, McMillan made a return to York to assist with youth development coaching whilst also coaching the club's under-16 team. In 2007, he moved on to coach in the centre of excellence for Hull, coaching both the club's under-14 and under-15 sides. In June 2008, he was appointed manager of former club Haxby, but resigned in November for personal reasons. He was appointed as Hull's enterprise co-ordinator in July 2009.

In July 2010, McMillan was appointed Assistant Head of Youth at Lincoln City. He moved on to join Barnet as youth-team manager and under-21s development coach in July 2012, being promoted to Head of Academy Coaching in October 2012. In July 2013 he joined Notts County as Head of Academy Coaching. McMillan returned to former club York after being appointed Academy manager on 23 May 2014. He left the club on 19 July 2016, having been asked to re-apply for his role as Academy manager.

He was appointed Academy Manager of Grimsby Town ahead of the 2016–17 season but by October he had resigned and was replaced by Neil Woods.

== Career statistics ==
Appearances and goals by club, season and competition
Club	Season	League			National Cup (Note: Includes FA Cup, Scottish Cup)		League Cup (Note: Includes League Cup)		Other		Total	
Club	Season	Division	Apps	Goals	Apps	Goals	Apps	Goals	Apps	Goals	Apps	Goals
York City	1987–88	Third Division	22	0	0	0	—		0	0	22	0
York City	1988–89	Fourth Division	2	0	0	0	0	0	0	0	2	0
York City	1989–90	Fourth Division	25	0	1	0	1	0	2 (Note: Appearances in Associate Members' Cup)	0	29	0
York City	1990–91	Fourth Division	45	1	3	0	2	0	3	0	53	1
York City	1991–92	Fourth Division	41	1	3	0	2	0	2	0	48	1
York City	1992–93	Third Division	42	0	1	0	2	0	5 (Note: Two appearances in Football League Trophy, three in Third Division play-offs)	0	50	0
York City	1993–94	Second Division	46	0	2	0	2	0	4 (Note: Two appearances in Football League Trophy, two in Second Division play-offs)	0	54	0
York City	1994–95	Second Division	43	1	2	0	2	0	2 (Note: Appearance(s) in Football League Trophy)	0	49	1
York City	1995–96	Second Division	46	1	1	0	5	0	5	0	57	0
York City	1996–97	Second Division	46	0	3	0	5	0	2	0	56	0
York City	1997–98	Second Division	30	1	0	0	4	0	0	0	34	1
York City	1998–99	Second Division	33	0	2	0	2	0	1	0	38	0
York City	Total		421	5	18	0	27	0	26	0	492	5
Ayr United	1999–2000	Scottish First Division	19	0	4	0	—		—		23	0
Career total			440	5	22	0	27	0	26	0	515	5

== Honours ==
York City

- Football League Third Division play-offs: 1993

Individual

- PFA Team of the Year: 1992–93 Third Division
- York City Clubman of the Year: 1995–96
