= Steve Beck =

Steve Beck is the name of:

- Steve Beck (chairman) (1957–2015), English football chairman
- Steve Beck (director), American film director

== See also ==
- Steven Beck (disambiguation)
