= Jon McCarthy =

Association football player (born 1970)

Personal information
- Full name: Jonathan David McCarthy
- Date of birth: 18 August 1970 (age 56)
- Place of birth: Middlesbrough, England
- Height: 5 ft 10 in (1.78 m)
- Position: Winger

Senior career*
Years	Team	Apps	(Gls)
1987–1989	Hartlepool United	1	(0)
1989–1990	Shepshed Charterhouse		
1990–1995	York City	199	(31)
1995–1997	Port Vale	94	(11)
1997–2002	Birmingham City	124	(8)
2002	→ Sheffield Wednesday (loan)	4	(0)
2002	Port Vale	8	(0)
2002	Doncaster Rovers	1	(0)
2002	York City	1	(0)
2002–2003	Carlisle United	21	(1)
2003–2004	Hucknall Town	34	(6)
2004–2007	Northwich Victoria	95	(1)
Total		582	(58)

International career
1996–1998	Northern Ireland B	2	(0)
1996–2001	Northern Ireland	18	(0)

Managerial career
- 2016–2017: Chester
- * Club domestic league appearances and goals

Jonathan David McCarthy (born 18 August 1970) is a former professional football player and manager.

McCarthy played as a winger and made around 700 appearances in his career, many of which were in the English Football League. Twice a Northern Ireland B international, he went on to win 18 senior caps for Northern Ireland. He began his career at Hartlepool United in 1987 before heading into the non-League scene with Shepshed Charterhouse in 1989. He returned to the professional game the following year after signing a contract with York City. He spent the next five years with the club, helping York to promotion via the play-offs in 1993, and twice being voted Clubman of the Year. In 1995, he joined Port Vale for a £450,000 fee. In his first year at Vale Park, he was awarded the club's Player of the Year award and also played in the Anglo-Italian Cup final.

In 1997, he was sold to Birmingham City for £1.5 million. The highlight of a five-year injury-plagued stay in Birmingham would be a League Cup final appearance in 2001. The next year, he was loaned out to Sheffield Wednesday before a return to Port Vale was followed by a brief spell with Doncaster Rovers and a cameo return at York City. Settling with Carlisle United, he left the Football League in 2003 to play for non-League Hucknall Town. Hucknall were crowned Northern Premier League Premier Division champions in 2003–04, and following this success, he won a deal with Northwich Victoria. He helped the club to the Conference North title in 2005–06, before he retired in 2007. He was appointed as first-team coach at Chester in January 2014, and after a brief spell as caretaker, became manager of the club in May 2016, before he was sacked in September 2017. He then joined Southport as assistant manager for four years before being appointed assistant manager at Connah's Quay Nomads in October 2021.

== Club career ==
=== Early career ===
Born in Middlesbrough, McCarthy began his career with Hartlepool United on non-contract terms in November 1987 under manager John Bird, making his first-team debut at the age of 17 by playing the last ten minutes of the last game of the 1987–88 season. Bird was sacked later in the year, and his successor, Bobby Moncur, released McCarthy. He had a short spell outside of the professional game after joining Shepshed Charterhouse of the Northern Premier League in March 1989.

=== York City ===
John Bird persuaded McCarthy to join York City on a part-time contract in March 1990. He made his debut in a 1–1 draw against Gillingham on 29 September. While still studying at university he signed professional forms with York in March 1991. He was named Clubman of the Year for 1991–92, after which he helped the club to promotion after winning the 1993 Football League Third Division play-off final at the end of 1992–93. York chairman Douglas Craig revealed the club had turned down a £150,000 offer from Bradford City for McCarthy, valuing him at at least three times that amount. Following a 1994–95 season described as "superb", he was named Clubman of the Year a second time. He played for York for five years and developed a reputation as one of the Football League's foremost right-sided wingers.

=== Port Vale ===
He was bought by John Rudge's Port Vale for a £450,000 fee in August 1995, which at the time was York's record transfer fee received. With McCarthy on the right-wing and Steve Guppy on the left-wing, Rudge played attacking wing-based football. During his spell with Vale, McCarthy earned plaudits for his league performances and his display in the club's FA Cup tie against Everton, scoring the winning goal in a 2–1 victory at Vale Park. He played in the 1996 Anglo-Italian Cup final, as Vale lost 5–2 to Genoa. He won the club's Player of the Year award in 1996. He played over 100 games within two seasons at Vale Park before he was snapped up by Birmingham City manager Trevor Francis in September 1997, who paid Vale a £1.5 million fee for him. Vale had offered him a new three-year deal as his current contract was due to expire the following summer, which he had rejected in favour of a move elsewhere.

=== Birmingham City ===
He helped Birmingham reach the First Division play-offs in 1998–99, where they lost out to Watford after a penalty shoot-out. They again reached the play-offs in 1999–2000. Still, McCarthy missed the semi-final defeat to Barnsley after breaking his leg. After his recovery he played in the 2001 League Cup final defeat against Liverpool. Despite breaking his leg three times within five years as a Birmingham player, he made well over 100 appearances for the club.

He had a one-month loan spell at fellow First Division side Sheffield Wednesday in April 2002. Told he had no future at the club by manager and former teammate Steve Bruce, he left Birmingham on a free transfer.

=== Later career ===
In August 2002, McCarthy returned to their previous club, Port Vale, who were now in the Second Division. Two months later he was released by Vale in the midst of a financial crisis and moved on to Doncaster Rovers in the Third Division. On 7 November 2002, he was on the move again, re-joining York on non-contract terms after training with the club. His fourth club in three months was Carlisle United, signing on a one-month contract on 29 November 2002. He remained at Brunton Park for the rest of 2002–03, playing in the 2003 Football League Trophy final at the Millennium Stadium, which ended in a 2–0 defeat to Bristol City despite McCarthy linking up well with Stuart Green and almost providing an assist for Richie Foran. It was in this tournament that he scored his first goal for the club, in a 2–0 win over Wrexham. His only other goal for the club came in a 1–0 league win over Southend United. However, after failing to agree terms with the club he was released in May 2003.

In the 2003–04 season, he teamed up with Steve Burr at Hucknall Town, helping them win the Northern Premier League Premier Division title, making 34 league appearances and scoring six goals. He then followed Burr to Conference National club Northwich Victoria at the start of 2004–05. He helped Northwich win the Conference North title in 2005–06, and therefore promotion back into the Conference National. Despite working as a full-time teacher he still managed to play the majority of Northwich's games until the end of 2006–07, at which point he retired from football.

== International career ==
In 1991, McCarthy won a bronze medal as part of the Great Britain football team at the XVI Summer Universiade, commonly known as the "World Student Games", in Sheffield. He was eligible to represent Northern Ireland on the international stage through parentage, making his debut against Sweden in 1996 while with Port Vale. He earned 18 caps for Northern Ireland from 1996 to 2001. He was capped twice by the Northern Ireland B team, in 1996 and 1998.

== Style of play ==
Port Vale player and lifelong fan Tom Pope described McCarthy as "a winger that drove at you" with raw pace and a player with good crossing ability. In May 2019, he was voted into the "Ultimate Port Vale XI" by members of the OneValeFan supporter website.

== Coaching career ==
In January 2014, he was appointed as first-team coach at Conference Premier club Chester by manager Steve Burr. He took over as caretaker manager with Ian Sharps as assistant after Burr was sacked on 7 April 2016, and after three wins from four matches that ensured Chester's survival in the National League, signed a one-year contract as permanent manager in May. In January 2017, he signed a new 2 1/2-year contract. However, after a poor start to the 2017–18 season, with the club picking up just one win from the opening eight league games, he was sacked on 6 September 2017.

McCarthy returned to their former club, Port Vale, in November 2017, working as the new manager Neil Aspin's fitness coach. Aspin was a former teammate at Port Vale, but said "It is not a case of jobs for the boys, it is because Jon is well qualified for the job that I want him to do, to deal with the fitness of the players and also to be another coach". However, he left the following month to take up a new post at Southport as assistant manager to Kevin Davies. He was retained at Southport after Liam Watson replaced Davies as manager in May 2018. He joined Cymru Premier champions Connah's Quay Nomads as assistant to manager Craig Harrison in October 2021. He was announced as the new head coach of the club's U21 team in September 2023. He later worked in the foundation at Aston Villa.

== Personal life ==
After retiring, McCarthy started working for BBC Radio Stoke as a match day reporter for Port Vale in August 2007. He then moved on to Birmingham Radio Station BRMB and Gold as a commentator on Birmingham City matches.

During his early years with York City, he attained a degree in sports science from Nottingham Polytechnic. After retiring, he used that degree to take up lecturing at Mid Cheshire College. He is also a qualified UEFA A licence coach.

== Career statistics ==
=== Club ===
Appearances and goals by club, season and competition
Club	Season	League			FA Cup		League Cup		Other		Total	
Club	Season	Division	Apps	Goals	Apps	Goals	Apps	Goals	Apps	Goals	Apps	Goals
Hartlepool United	1987–88	Fourth Division	1	0	0	0	0	0	0	0	1	0
York City	1990–91	Fourth Division	27	2	3	0	0	0	1 (Note: Appearance(s) in Associate Members Cup)	1	31	3
York City	1991–92	Fourth Division	42	6	3	1	2	1	2	1	49	9
York City	1992–93	Third Division	42	7	1	0	2	0	5 (Note: Two appearances in Football League Trophy, three in Third Division play-offs)	0	50	7
York City	1993–94	Second Division	44	7	2	1	2	0	5 (Note: Two appearances and one goal in Football League Trophy, three in Second Division play-offs)	1	53	9
York City	1994–95	Second Division	44	9	2	1	2	0	2 (Note: Appearance(s) in Football League Trophy)	0	50	10
York City	Total		199	31	11	3	8	1	15	3	233	38
Port Vale	1995–96	First Division	45	7	6	1	2	0	8 (Note: Appearances in Anglo-Italian Cup)	2	61	10
Port Vale	1996–97	First Division	45	4	1	0	6	2	—		52	6
Port Vale	1997–98	First Division	4	0	—		2	0	—		6	0
Port Vale	Total		94	11	7	1	10	2	8	2	119	16
Birmingham City	1997–98	First Division	41	4	3	0	—		—		44	4
Birmingham City	1998–99	First Division	43	0	1	0	5	0	2 (Note: Appearances in First Division play-offs)	0	51	0
Birmingham City	1999–2000	First Division	21	4	0	0	4	0	0	0	25	4
Birmingham City	2000–01	First Division	15	0	0	0	1	0	2	0	18	0
Birmingham City	2001–02	First Division	4	0	0	0	0	0	0	0	4	0
Birmingham City	Total		124	8	4	0	10	0	4	0	142	8
Sheffield Wednesday (loan)	2001–02	First Division	4	0	—		—		—		4	0
Port Vale	2002–03	Second Division	8	0	—		1	0	—		9	0
Doncaster Rovers	2002–03	Conference	1	0	0	0	—		—		1	0
York City	2002–03	Third Division	1	0	0	0	—		—		1	0
Carlisle United	2002–03	Third Division	21	1	2	0	—		4	1	27	2
Hucknall Town	2003–04	NPL Premier Division	34	6			—				34	6
Northwich Victoria	2004–05	Conference National	35	0	1	0	—		0	0	36	0
Northwich Victoria	2005–06	Conference North	32	1	4	0	—		3 (Note: Appearances in FA Trophy)	0	39	1
Northwich Victoria	2006–07	Conference National	28	0	1	0	—		4	0	33	0
Northwich Victoria	Total		95	1	6	0	—		7	0	108	1
Career total			582	58	30	4	29	3	38	6	679	71

=== International ===
Appearances and goals by national team and year
National team	Year	Apps	Goals
Northern Ireland	1996	1	0
Northern Ireland	1997	4	0
Northern Ireland	1998	4	0
Northern Ireland	1999	7	0
Northern Ireland	2001	2	0
Total		18	0

=== Managerial statistics ===
As of matches played 2 September 2017

Managerial record by team and tenure
Team	From	To	Record					Ref
Team	From	To	P	W	D	L	Win %	Ref
Chester	7 April 2016	6 September 2017	62	19	15	28	30.6	
Total			62	19	15	28	30.6	—

== Honours ==
York City

- Football League Third Division play-offs: 1993

Port Vale

- Anglo-Italian Cup runner-up: 1995–96

Birmingham City

- Football League Cup runner-up: 2000–01

Carlisle United

- Football League Trophy runner-up: 2002–03

Hucknall Town

- Northern Premier League Premier Division: 2003–04

Northwich Victoria

- Conference North: 2005–06

Individual

- York City Clubman of the Year: 1991–92, 1994–95
- Port Vale Player of the Year: 1995–96
- Port Vale Hall of Fame: inducted 2026 (inaugural)
