= Steve Tutill =

English footballer (born 1969)

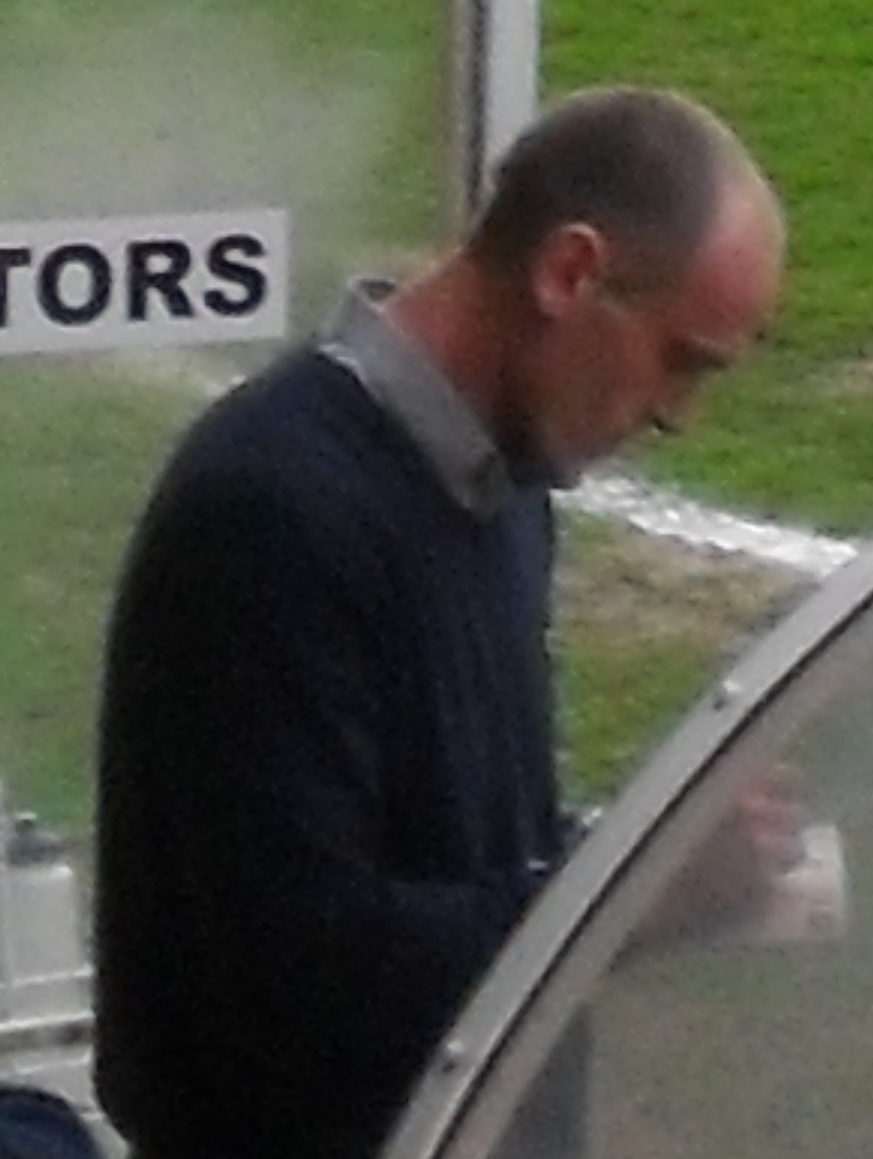
- Tutill in 2011

Personal information
- Full name: Stephen Alan Tutill
- Date of birth: 1 October 1969 (age 57)
- Place of birth: York, England
- Height: 6 ft 0 in (1.83 m)
- Position: Centre-back

Youth career
- –1987: York City

Senior career*
Years	Team	Apps	(Gls)
1987–1998	York City	301	(6)
1998	→ Darlington (loan)	6	(0)
1998–2000	Darlington	64	(0)
2000–2002	Chesterfield	19	(1)
Total		390	(7)

International career
1985	England schools	8	(1)
- * Club domestic league appearances and goals

Stephen Alan Tutill (born 1 October 1969) is an English former professional footballer who played as a centre-back in the Football League for York City, Darlington and Chesterfield.

== Early life and career ==
Stephen Alan Tutill was born 1 October 1969 in York. He joined the York City youth system on associate schoolboy forms and having been capped eight times by England schools in 1985, scoring once, he entered York's Youth Training Scheme in 1986. He made his first-team debut on 6 January 1987 for York as a substitute in a 1–1 draw with Rochdale in the Associate Members' Cup. He suffered a broken ankle at Bristol City in December, but having impressed manager Bobby Saxton he signed a professional contract with York in January 1988. He was named the club's Clubman of the Year for the 1990–91 season, which he completed with 47 appearances for York. He played in both legs of York's 4–3 aggregate victory over Manchester United in the League Cup second round in the 1995–96 season.

Tutill joined Darlington on a one-month loan in February 1998 ane made his debut against Mansfield Town on 21 February. He took over as captain during this period and on 19 March agreed to sign for the club permanently on a free transfer. He signed for Chesterfield in July 2000 on a three-year contract after talks over a new deal with Darlington broke down.

An Achilles tendon injury sustained in December forced Tutill to retire from football in May 2002 and he moved on to work in the prison service.

== Career statistics ==
Appearances and goals by club, season and competition
Club	Season	League			FA Cup		League Cup		Other		Total	
Club	Season	Division	Apps	Goals	Apps	Goals	Apps	Goals	Apps	Goals	Apps	Goals
York City	1986–87	Third Division	0	0	0	0	0	0	1 (Note: Appearance(s) in Associate Members' Cup/Football League Trophy)	0	1	0
York City	1987–88	Third Division	21	0	4	0	2	0	2	0	29	0
York City	1988–89	Fourth Division	22	1	1	0	1	0	1	0	25	1
York City	1989–90	Fourth Division	42	0	1	0	3	0	3	1	49	1
York City	1990–91	Fourth Division	42	0	3	0	2	0	3	0	50	0
York City	1991–92	Fourth Division	39	1	3	0	1	0	2	0	45	1
York City	1992–93	Third Division	8	0	0	0	1	0	1 (Note: Appearance(s) in Third Division play-offs)	0	10	0
York City	1993–94	Second Division	46	4	2	0	2	0	5 (Note: Three appearances in Football League Trophy, two appearances in Second Division play-offs)	0	55	4
York City	1994–95	Second Division	39	0	0	0	2	0	1	0	42	0
York City	1995–96	Second Division	25	0	1	0	5	0	5	0	36	0
York City	1996–97	Second Division	15	0	4	0	1	0	1	0	21	0
York City	1997–98	Second Division	2	0	0	0	1	0	0	0	3	0
York City	Total		301	6	19	0	21	0	25	1	366	7
Darlington	1997–98	Third Division	7	0	—		—		—		7	0
Darlington	1998–99	Third Division	36	0	3	0	1	0	2	0	42	0
Darlington	1999–2000	Third Division	27	0	3	1	0	0	3	0	33	1
Darlington	Total		70	0	6	1	1	0	5	0	82	1
Chesterfield	2000–01	Third Division	19	1	1	0	3	0	1	0	24	1
Career total			390	7	26	1	25	0	31	1	472	9

== Honours ==
York City

- Football League Third Division play-offs: 1993

Individual

- York City Clubman of the Year: 1990–91
