= Steven Beck =

Steven or Stephen Beck may refer to:

== Real people ==
- Stephen Beck, American artist, writer, toy designer and inventor
- Steven Beck, musician in Tickle Me Pink

== Fictional characters ==
- Steven Beck, character in Z Nation
- Steven Beck, character in Witness Protection (film)
- Steven Beck, character in Leviathan (1989 film)

== See also ==
- Steve Beck (disambiguation)
