= Wayne Hall (footballer) =

English footballer

Personal information
- Full name: Wayne Hall
- Date of birth: 25 October 1968 (age 58)
- Place of birth: Rotherham, England
- Height: 5 ft 9 in (1.75 m)
- Position: Defender

Senior career*
Years	Team	Apps	(Gls)
1988–1989	Darlington	0	(0)
1989	Hatfield Main	?	(?)
1989–2001	York City	373	(9)
2001–2002	Gainsborough Trinity		
- * Club domestic league appearances and goals

Wayne Hall (born 25 October 1968 in Rotherham, England) also known by his nickname "Ginner" is an English former footballer. He played much of his career at York City as a left-sided defender and is known for his shaved headed image.

== Career ==
Starting his career in 1988 as a trainee at Darlington, Hall moved to non-league side Hartfield Main before transferring to York City in 1989.

Hall would remain at the club until his retirement in 2001, notching up 438 appearances in total (373 in the league) and scoring 11 goals. Along with the likes of Dean Kiely and Andy McMillan, Hall would become one of the City's faithful's most popular players of the 1990s.

The 1990s were a particularly successful time for City. They reached the playoffs of the Third Division in 1993; when the final against Crewe Alexandra at Wembley went down to penalties, Hall took the final penalty and scored, securing City's promotion to the Second Division.

1994 saw Hall along with City reaching the playoffs again, this time in the Second Division, although they were not successful. Hall played in two giant killings which further put the squad on the map came in the 1990s, first beating Manchester United 3–0 at Old Trafford and then the following season they beat Everton 3–2 with Hall in the squad.

Hall retired from football in 2002 while playing for Gainsborough Trinity.

York's fanzine Ginner's Left Foot is named in honour of the foot Hall used to score the penalty which secured City promotion to Division Two.

== Honours ==
York City

- Football League Third Division play-offs: 1993
