= Paul Atkin =

English footballer

Personal information
- Full name: Paul Anthony Atkin
- Date of birth: 3 September 1969 (age 57)
- Place of birth: Nottingham, England
- Position: Central defender

Senior career*
Years	Team	Apps	(Gls)
1987–1989	Notts County	0	(0)
1989–1991	Bury	21	(1)
1991–1997	York City	153	(3)
1997	→ Leyton Orient (loan)	5	(0)
1997–1998	Scarborough	36	(1)
Total		214	(5)

International career
1985–1986	England U16	6	(1)
- * Club domestic league appearances and goals

Paul Anthony Atkin (born 3 September 1969 in Nottingham, England) is an English former footballer who played in the Football League for Bury, York City, Leyton Orient and Scarborough.

== Biography ==
Atkin was born in Nottingham on 3 September 1969. He started his football career as a trainee with Notts County in July 1987, and moved to Bury in March 1989 for whom he made 21 appearances, scoring one goal. He joined York City on a free transfer in July 1991, made 153 league appearances in five seasons, scoring three goals, and was part of the promotion-winning team of 1993. He went to Leyton Orient on loan in March 1997, making five league appearances, and transferred to Scarborough in August 1997, for whom he made 36 league appearances, scoring once.

== Honours ==
York City

- Football League Third Division play-offs: 1993
