= Mark Smith (footballer, born 1973) =

English footballer (born 1973)

Personal information
- Full name: Mark Allen Smith
- Date of birth: 2 January 1973 (age 53)
- Place of birth: Birmingham, England
- Position: Goalkeeper

Senior career*
Years	Team	Apps	(Gls)
1991–1992	Nottingham Forest	0	(0)
1992–1995	Crewe Alexandra	63	(0)
1996–1997	Walsall	0	(0)
1997–1998	Cardiff City	0	(0)
1997	Rushden & Diamonds		
1998–2000	Bedford Town		
2000	Morecambe		
2001	Scarborough		
- * Club domestic league appearances and goals

Mark Allen Smith (born 2 January 1973) is an English former footballer who played in the Football League for Crewe Alexandra.

He started as a trainee at Nottingham Forest before being signed by Crewe in 1992. During three seasons at Crewe, he played in 82 games. Playing For Crewe at Darlington in a Third Division match on 12 March 1994, he was sent off after 19 seconds.
