= Dean Kiely =

Footballer (born 1970)

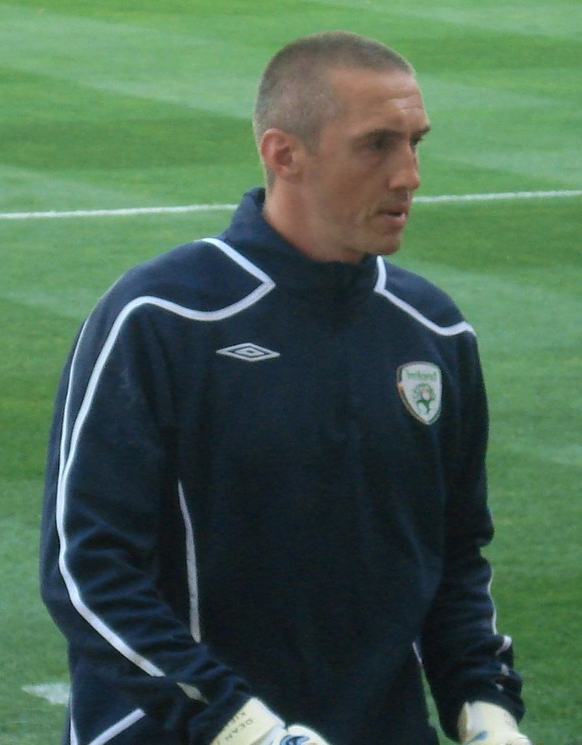
- Kiely with the Republic of Ireland national team in 2008

Personal information
- Full name: Dean Laurence Kiely
- Date of birth: 10 October 1970 (age 56)
- Place of birth: Salford, England
- Height: 6 ft 0 in (1.83 m)
- Position: Goalkeeper

Youth career
- West Bromwich Albion
- –1987: Coventry City

Senior career*
Years	Team	Apps	(Gls)
1987–1990	Coventry City	0	(0)
1989	→ Ipswich Town (loan)	0	(0)
1990	→ York City (loan)	0	(0)
1990–1996	York City	210	(0)
1996–1999	Bury	137	(0)
1999–2006	Charlton Athletic	222	(0)
2006–2007	Portsmouth	15	(0)
2006–2007	→ Luton Town (loan)	11	(0)
2007–2011	West Bromwich Albion	69	(0)
Total		664	(0)

International career
	England U15	13	(0)
	England U16	13	(0)
1988	England U18	4	(0)
1999	Republic of Ireland B	1	(0)
1999–2008	Republic of Ireland	11	(0)
- * Club domestic league appearances and goals

Dean Laurence Kiely (born 10 October 1970) is a former professional footballer who played as a goalkeeper. He is the goalkeeping coach for the Republic of Ireland national team. Born in England, he won eleven caps for the Republic of Ireland as a player. Kiely has previously worked as the goalkeeping coach at West Bromwich Albion, Norwich City and Crystal Palace.

== Club career ==
Born in Salford, Lancashire, Kiely trained with the West Bromwich Albion youth system as a schoolboy before being accepted into the FA School of Excellence at Lilleshall. After Albion he progressed through the Coventry City youth system as a trainee before signing a professional contract on 30 October 1987. He went to Ipswich Town on loan in November 1989 but failed to make any league appearances. Kiely joined York City on loan on 9 March 1990 before joining permanently in May, when he was given his first chance at regular first-team football. He made 210 league appearances for them between 1990 and 1996, and played in their 3–0 win over Manchester United at Old Trafford in the League Cup.

Following a trial with Plymouth Argyle, Kiely signed for Bury on 15 August 1996 for a tribunal-decided fee of £125,000. He spent three seasons at Bury, making 137 league appearances in the process. He was instrumental in Bury winning the Second Division title in the 1996–97 season, most notably with an 88th-minute penalty save in the penultimate game of the season from Watford's Tommy Mooney. Bury requiring a point to guarantee a second automatic promotion in as many seasons had Kiely to thank after he kept the scoreline at 0–0 in a memorable day at Vicarage Road.

Kiely moved to Charlton Athletic for a fee of £1 million on 26 May 1999 and made his debut on 7 August against Barnsley. He was Charlton's regular keeper from 1999 to 2005, and was popular with the club's fans as well as having a majestic "shut out" rate. Having been signed from a lower-division club he was seen as an example of Alan Curbishley's ability to spot talent in unheralded players. Kiely made a point-blank save from Birmingham City player Christophe Dugarry in a game at St Andrew's on 3 November 2003; Charlton went on to win the game 2–1 and Kiely later named the save as the favourite one of his career. Other highlights in his time at Charlton came when he saved penalties in 1-0 wins against Arsenal (saving from Nelson Vivas) and Crystal Palace (saving from Andy Johnson).

He signed for Portsmouth for an undisclosed fee on 25 January 2006, and played a large part in their escape from relegation that same season. His Pompey debut was in the FA Cup against Liverpool at Fratton Park in a 2–1 defeat. After David James signed for Portsmouth on 11 August, he voiced his frustration at having to compete with a top goalkeeper for the No. 1 spot, and with Jamie Ashdown also on their books, he opted to leave Portsmouth in the autumn.

He signed for Championship club Luton Town on a one-month loan on 23 November 2006, making his debut in the 2–1 away defeat at Southampton on 25 November. He then joined Championship side West Bromwich Albion on 30 January 2007, signing a one-and-a-half-year contract, as a replacement for Russell Hoult. Kiely made his Albion debut in a 2–1 win over Plymouth Argyle the following day.

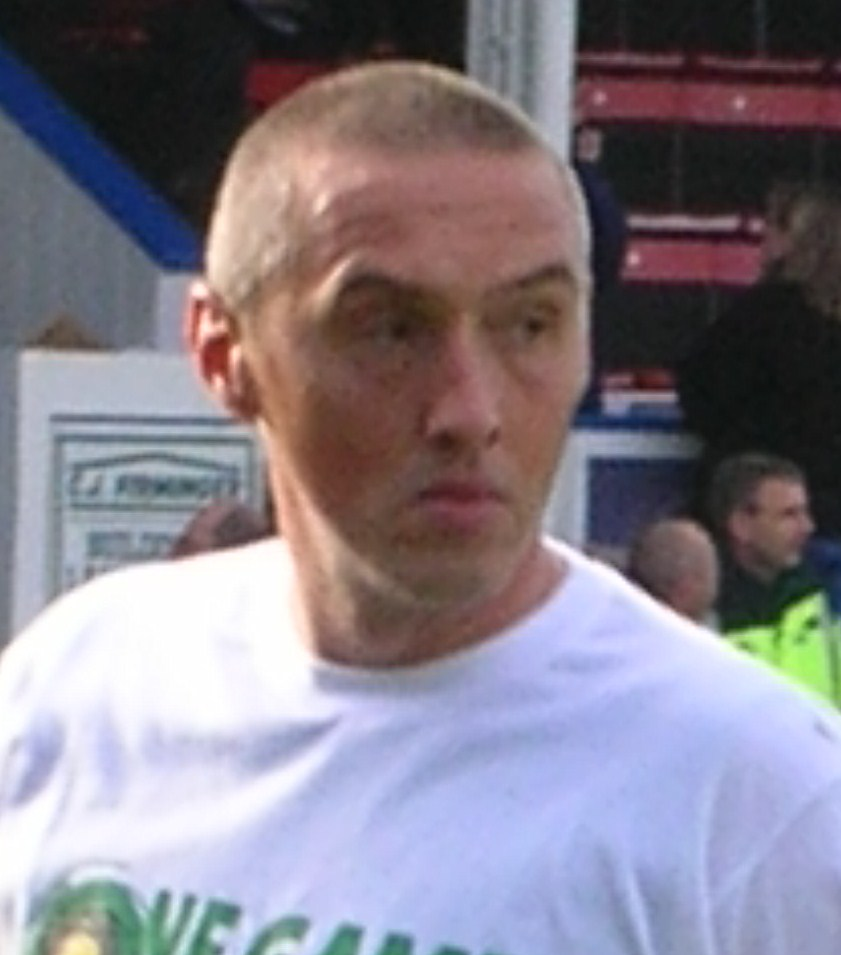
Kiely warming up for West Bromwich Albion in 2007

Kiely reached the milestone of 700 senior career appearances on 1 September 2007, and recorded a clean sheet as Albion beat Barnsley 2–0. He signed a new deal with West Brom in January 2008, which would expire in June 2009. Kiely's clean sheet in the 3–0 home win against Plymouth Argyle on 1 March 2008 saw him named in the Championship Team of the Week. Later that month however, he was the subject of criticism and booing from his team's own fans during Albion's 4–3 victory over Colchester United, but retained his starting place. He nonetheless kept 18 clean sheets in all competitions to win the Championship Golden Glove award, while Albion won promotion to the Premier League as champions and reached the FA Cup semi-final. Kiely then had to play second fiddle to England international Scott Carson but in spite of that, he was awarded a one-year extension at the club as a 'reward' from boss Tony Mowbray for his professionalism. Following an injury to Carson in training, Kiely was handed his first Premier League start against Wigan Athletic on 9 May 2009, producing some fine saves as the Baggies won 3–1 to keep their survival hopes alive, earning praise from Mowbray in the process. Mowbray was also quick to hail Kiely's professionalism throughout the season in handling his situation with dignity. That performance ensured that he kept his place for the club's final two games of the season, although he was unable to prevent relegation following a 2–0 defeat at the hands of Liverpool. On 24 May 2009 he kept a clean sheet in the club's final game against Blackburn Rovers as the match finished in a 0–0 stalemate. Since relegation to the Championship Kiely has once again had to be content playing second fiddle to Carson, who was named the new club captain by new manager Roberto Di Matteo, but on 8 December 2009 he made his first Championship appearance of the season as a replacement, coming on for the sent-off Carson and saving a penalty (though Peter Whittingham scored from the rebound) in a 2–0 home defeat to Cardiff City. He went on to play a run of three games while Carson sat through a suspension following his headbutting of Cardiff striker Michael Chopra, against QPR (2–2), Peterborough United (2–0), and Scunthorpe United (3–1). Kiely had also been performing the duties of goalkeeping coach following the retirement of former trainer Joe Corrigan, and in April 2010 was officially named goalkeeping coach of the club. On 18 April 2010, Kiely made his fifth appearance of the season as a half-time substitute for the injured Carson in a 2–0 home win over Middlesbrough. He retired as a player at the end of the 2010–11 season after West Brom opted against extending his contract, however he remained at the club as a coach. In January 2015, upon the appointment of new West Bromwich Albion manager, Tony Pulis, Kiely was released by the club. In March 2015, he was appointed Norwich City's goalkeeping coach.

In September 2017, Kiely was appointed the goalkeeping coach at Championship club Preston North End.

In January 2018, Kiely joined Premier League club Crystal Palace as goalkeeping coach. He was sacked from the job in July 2025.

== International career ==
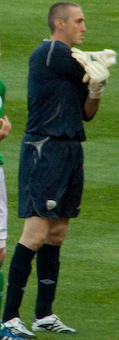
Kiely before a Republic of Ireland match in 2008

Kiely played for England at under-15 (13 caps), under-16 (13 caps) and under-18 (four caps in 1988) levels. He made one appearance for Republic of Ireland B, starting in a 4–3 win over League of Ireland XI on 9 February 1999, in which he was substituted for Nick Colgan. He went on to represent the Republic of Ireland at full international level, earning his first cap as a substitute in a UEFA Euro 2000 qualifying play-off against Turkey in November 1999. He retired from international football in February 2003, but in April 2008 Ireland's assistant manager Liam Brady suggested that Kiely could make a return to the squad. The rumours were then confirmed when he returned to the Ireland squad in Giovanni Trapattoni's first squad as manager in May 2008. He won his first cap in five years when he appeared in the Republic's 1–1 draw with Serbia that month, playing the full 90 minutes. On 28 May 2009, he walked out of the Ireland squad after Trapattoni informed him that he would be replacing Shay Given with Keiren Westwood for the second half of the friendly International against Nigeria at Craven Cottage on 29 May. He was capped 11 times by the Republic of Ireland, last appearing in 2008.

== Personal life ==
Away from football, Kiely made a guest appearance on Bravo's Saved by the Ball lifestyle makeover programme in 2006, and has also worked as a match summariser for BBC Radio 5 Live. He plays golf and is interested in horse racing, and is friends with WBA fan & ITV presenter Adrian Chiles. Kiely married Tracey in Las Vegas in May 1999. The couple have three children; Millie, Chris and Mason. Chris is a former professional goalkeeper.

== Career statistics ==
=== Club ===
Appearances and goals by club, season and competition
Club	Season	League			FA Cup		League Cup		Other		Total	
Club	Season	Division	Apps	Goals	Apps	Goals	Apps	Goals	Apps	Goals	Apps	Goals
York City	1990–91	Fourth Division	17	0	0	0	0	0	1 (Note: Appearance in Associate Members' Cup)	0	18	0
York City	1991–92	Fourth Division	21	0	0	0	0	0	1	0	22	0
York City	1992–93	Third Division	40	0	0	0	2	0	4 (Note: One appearance in Football League Trophy, three in Third Division play-offs)	0	46	0
York City	1993–94	Second Division	46	0	2	0	2	0	5 (Note: Three appearances in Football League Trophy, two in Second Division play-offs)	0	55	0
York City	1994–95	Second Division	46	0	2	0	2	0	2 (Note: Appearances in Football League Trophy)	0	52	0
York City	1995–96	Second Division	40	0	0	0	3	0	3	0	46	0
York City	Total		210	0	4	0	9	0	16	0	239	0
Bury	1996–97	Second Division	46	0	1	0	4	0	3	0	54	0
Bury	1997–98	First Division	46	0	2	0	4	0	—		52	0
Bury	1998–99	First Division	45	0	1	0	5	0	—		51	0
Bury	Total		137	0	4	0	13	0	3	0	157	0
Charlton Athletic	1999–2000	First Division	45	0	4	0	2	0	—		51	0
Charlton Athletic	2000–01	Premier League	25	0	2	0	1	0	—		28	0
Charlton Athletic	2001–02	Premier League	38	0	2	0	3	0	—		43	0
Charlton Athletic	2002–03	Premier League	38	0	2	0	1	0	—		41	0
Charlton Athletic	2003–04	Premier League	37	0	1	0	2	0	—		40	0
Charlton Athletic	2004–05	Premier League	36	0	3	0	2	0	—		41	0
Charlton Athletic	2005–06	Premier League	3	0	0	0	1	0	—		4	0
Charlton Athletic	Total		222	0	14	0	12	0	—		248	0
Portsmouth	2005–06	Premier League	15	0	1	0	—		—		16	0
Portsmouth	2006–07	Premier League	0	0	0	0	1	0	—		1	0
Portsmouth	Total		15	0	1	0	1	0	0	0	17	0
Luton Town (loan)	2006–07	Championship	11	0	—		—		—		11	0
West Bromwich Albion	2006–07	Championship	17	0	2	0	—		3 (Note: Appearances in Championship play-offs)	0	22	0
West Bromwich Albion	2007–08	Championship	44	0	6	0	3	0	—		53	0
West Bromwich Albion	2008–09	Premier League	3	0	0	0	1	0	—		4	0
West Bromwich Albion	2009–10	Championship	5	0	0	0	3	0	—		8	0
West Bromwich Albion	2010–11	Premier League	0	0	0	0	0	0	—		0	0
West Bromwich Albion	Total		69	0	8	0	7	0	3	0	87	0
Career total			664	0	31	0	42	0	22	0	759	0

=== International ===
Appearances and goals by national team and year
National team	Year	Apps	Goals
Republic of Ireland	1999	2	0
Republic of Ireland	2000	2	0
Republic of Ireland	2002	3	0
Republic of Ireland	2003	1	0
Republic of Ireland	2008	3	0
Total		11	0

== Honours ==
York City

- Football League Third Division play-offs: 1993

Bury

- Football League Second Division: 1996–97

Charlton Athletic

- Football League First Division: 1999–2000

West Bromwich Albion

- Football League Championship: 2007–08

Individual

- Charlton Athletic Player of the Year: 2001–02, 2003–04
- Football League Championship Golden Glove: 2007–08

== See also ==
- List of Republic of Ireland international footballers born outside the Republic of Ireland
