= Paul Stancliffe =

English footballer

Personal information
- Full name: Paul Ian Stancliffe
- Date of birth: 5 May 1958 (age 68)
- Place of birth: Sheffield, England
- Height: 6 ft 2 in (1.88 m)
- Position: Central defender

Senior career*
Years	Team	Apps	(Gls)
1975–1982	Rotherham United	285	(7)
1983–1990	Sheffield United	278	(12)
1990	→ Rotherham United (loan)	5	(0)
1990	Wolverhampton Wanderers	17	(0)
1991–1994	York City	89	(3)
Total		674	(22)
- * Club domestic league appearances and goals

Paul Ian Stancliffe (born 5 May 1958) is a former footballer who played in the position of central defender.

== Career ==
Stancliffe was born in Sheffield, Yorkshire. He first made his way in the game as a Rotherham United apprentice. He made his league debut for Rotherham at Brighton & Hove Albion on the opening day of the 1975–76 season, and immediately won himself a regular place in the side. He scarcely missed a game for seven years, and in 1981 he won a Third Division championship medal.

After holding an ever-present record in his first campaign in the Second Division, he was injured in one of the early matches of the 1982–83 season and missed much of the remaining campaign, but returned towards the end of the season.

During the close-season he was transferred to hometown club Sheffield United after making 285 league appearances for Rotherham. He made his debut for United against Gillingham at the Priestfield Stadium on 27 August 1983, and missed only three games as Sheffield United clinched promotion to the Second Division.

Stancliffe, usually referred to as just Stan by the fans, played for several seasons with distinction at United and was captain for much of his time at Bramall Lane. Stancliffe notably captained United to two successive promotions from the old Third Division, through to the old First Division in 1990. However Stancliffe was now 32 and was released by Dave Bassett, and after a brief spell at Wolverhampton Wanderers joined York City and captained City to promotion at Wembley in 1993. Stancliffe stayed at York, initially as Assistant Manager and then as a youth development officer. He left in April 2005 to take up a role as Doncaster Rovers Under 18 coach.

== Honours ==
Rotherham United

- Football League Third Division: 1980–81

York City

- Football League Third Division play-offs: 1993

Individual

- PFA Team of the Year: 1992–93 Third Division
