= Ian Blackstone =

English footballer

Personal information
- Full name: Ian Kenneth Blackstone
- Date of birth: 7 August 1964 (age 62)
- Place of birth: Harrogate, England
- Height: 6 ft 0 in (1.83 m)
- Position: Striker

Senior career*
Years	Team	Apps	(Gls)
	Harrogate Town	?	(?)
1990–1994	York City	129	(37)
1994	Scarborough	13	(0)
1994–1995	Instant-Dict FC	?	(?)
	Southport	?	(?)
- * Club domestic league appearances and goals

Ian Kenneth Blackstone (born 7 August 1964) is an English former footballer from Harrogate.

== Honours ==
York City

- Football League Third Division play-offs: 1993
