= Jason McGill =

English businessman and association football chairman

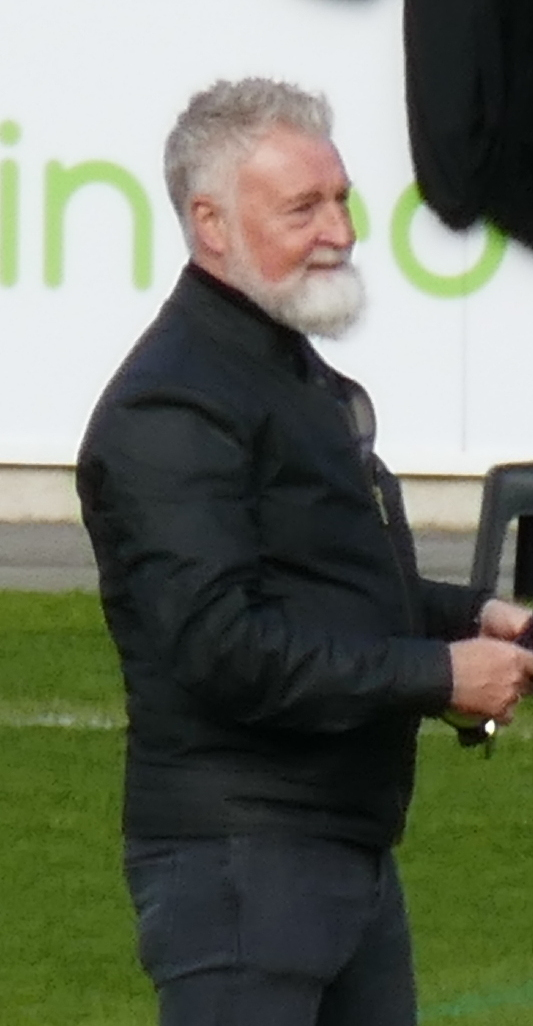
McGill in 2022

Jason Alexander McGill (born 7 April 1966) is a former chairman of York City Football Club, a professional football club in York, North Yorkshire, England.

== Biography ==
Jason Alexander McGill was born on 7 April 1966. McGill played football for the reserve team of then non-League cub Wycombe Wanderers whilst at university in London.

He grew up as a York City supporter and made a donation of £50,000 to the club while it was undergoing financial difficulties. He joined York City as a director after the Supporters' Trust completed their takeover of the club on 26 March 2003, eventually taking the role of managing director in September 2004 after Steve Beck resigned as chairman.

McGill was heavily involved in negotiating the deal for York City to gain full control of Bootham Crescent, after over 99% of the shareholders of Bootham Crescent Holdings voted in favour of the deal in January 2005. He also secured sponsorship from Nestlé Rowntree for Bootham Crescent in January 2005, which saw the ground renamed KitKat Crescent.

The York City Supporters' Trust voted by three to one to accept a takeover offer made by McGill at a meeting on 6 June 2006. His company J M Packaging offered to invest a substantial sum into the club, in return for a majority shareholding. He assumed the role of chairman at York by the start of the 2008–09 season.

His sister Sophie Hicks was on the board at York as Communications Director until stepping down in May 2016.

As of February 2026, McGill is attempting to sue York City Football Club for £4.2 Million.
