= Clive Wigginton =

English footballer

Personal information
- Full name: Clive Anthony Wigginton
- Date of birth: 18 October 1950 (age 76)
- Place of birth: Sheffield, England
- Height: 6 ft 0 in (1.83 m)
- Position: Centre half

Youth career
- –: Grimsby Town

Senior career*
Years	Team	Apps	(Gls)
1968–1975	Grimsby Town	173	(6)
1975–1977	Scunthorpe United	88	(7)
1977–1979	Lincoln City	60	(6)
1979–1982	Grimsby Town	122	(2)
1982	→ Doncaster Rovers (loan)	13	(1)
1982	Torquay United	9	(0)
1982–1983	Doncaster Rovers	18	(0)
1983–19??	Gainsborough Trinity		
- * Club domestic league appearances and goals

Clive Anthony Wigginton (born 18 October 1950) is an English former footballer who scored 22 goals from 483 appearances in the lower divisions of The Football League. He played for Grimsby Town, Scunthorpe United, Lincoln City, Doncaster Rovers and Torquay United, before moving into non-league football with Gainsborough Trinity. He played as a centre half.

== Honours ==
Grimsby Town

- Football League Third Division: 1979–80
