= John Borthwick (footballer) =

English footballer

Personal information
- Full name: John Robert Borthwick
- Date of birth: 24 March 1964 (age 62)
- Place of birth: Hartlepool, England
- Height: 6 ft 0 in (1.83 m)
- Position: Forward

Youth career
- Owton Manor SC

Senior career*
Years	Team	Apps	(Gls)
1982–1989	Hartlepool United	117	(14)
1989–1992	Darlington	117	(34)
1992–1993	York City	33	(8)
1993–1994	Gateshead	7	(0)
Total		274	(56)
- * Club domestic league appearances and goals

John Robert Borthwick (born 24 March 1964) is an English former professional footballer who made 225 appearances in the Football League playing as a forward for Hartlepool United, Darlington and York City.

Borthwick was born in Hartlepool, County Durham. He was educated at Brierton Comprehensive School, where he was captain of his age-group team. He represented the Hartlepool Schools XI as a midfield player before becoming a striker towards the end of his school career. After scoring prolifically in local league and junior football for the Henry Smith YC and Owton Manor SC clubs across 1980-82, Borthwick signed for his local club, Hartlepool United, and made his debut on 3 January 1983 in a 4–1 defeat away at Colchester United. He spent six seasons with Hartlepool, scoring 16 goals from 135 games in all competitions. Borthwick was a hard-working and unselfish striker whose physical presence and aerial ability helped strike partners such as Alan Shoulder and Kevin Dixon score freely, although his contribution often went unrecognised by many Hartlepool fans. Borthwick moved on to Darlington, newly relegated to the Conference for the 1989–90 season. His 19 goals made him Darlington's leading scorer as they won the Conference title to return to the Football League, and was again their top scorer as they won back-to-back titles to gain promotion to the Third Division. He had one more season with Darlington, then spent the 1992–93 season with York City before moving into non-League football with Gateshead. Borthwick ended his career by winning the FA Vase with Whitby in 1997.

== Honours ==
Darlington

- Football League Fourth Division: 1990–91

York City

- Football League Third Division play-offs: 1993
