= Dave McKearney =

Former English footballer

Personal information
- Full name: David Jonathan McKearney
- Date of birth: 20 June 1968 (age 58)
- Place of birth: Crosby, Lancashire, England
- Height: 5 ft 10 in (1.78 m)
- Positions: Defender; midfielder

Youth career
- Bolton Wanderers

Senior career*
Years	Team	Apps	(Gls)
	Northwich Victoria	3	(0)
1989–1993	Crewe Alexandra	108	(12)
1993–1995	Wigan Athletic	49	(9)
1995–1996	Chorley		
1996–2004	Morecambe	299	(14)
2004–2006	Burscough		
- * Club domestic league appearances and goals

David Jonathan McKearney (born 20 June 1968) is an English former footballer. He was a versatile player who played both as a defender and midfielder.

== Career ==
He made his Football League debut for Crewe Alexandra, coming on as a substitute in a goal-less draw at Preston North End on 17 October 1989. After sporadic appearances during the rest of the season, he gained a regular starting place after left back Paul Edwards was sold to Coventry City in March 1990, and McKearney scored his first Crewe goal in a 2–1 defeat at Mansfield Town on 28 April 1990. In 1993, in his last game for the club, McKearney was part of the Crewe side beaten by York City after a penalty shoot-out in the 1993 Football League Third Division play-off final at Wembley Stadium on 29 May 1993, he scored an extra-time penalty to make the score 1–1 and take the game to the shoot-out. During his time at Crewe, McKearney played 108 league games, scoring 12 goals.

After time at Wigan Athletic, McKearney moved to Morecambe from Chorley in July 1996, and made almost 300 appearances in just under ten years at the club. He was part of the team that won the Spalding Cup in 1998, and won two Lancashire Cup winners' medals with the club.
