= Mike Cecere =

English footballer

Personal information
- Full name: Michele Joseph Cecere
- Date of birth: 4 January 1968 (age 58)
- Place of birth: Chester, England
- Height: 6 ft 0 in (1.83 m)
- Position: Striker

Youth career
- Oldham Athletic

Senior career*
Years	Team	Apps	(Gls)
1986–1988	Oldham Athletic	52	(8)
1988–1990	Huddersfield Town	54	(8)
1989	→ Stockport County (loan)	1	(0)
1990–1994	Walsall	112	(32)
1994–1996	Exeter City	43	(11)
1996–1997	Rochdale	4	(1)
Total		266	(60)
- * Club domestic league appearances and goals

Michele Joseph Cecere (born 4 January 1968) is an English former professional footballer who played in the Football League as a striker for Oldham Athletic, Huddersfield Town, Stockport County, Walsall, Exeter City and Rochdale.
