= Douglas Craig =

British football chairman (1929–2025)

Douglas Malcolm Craig (10 July 1929 – 10 May 2025) was a British football executive who served as the chairman of York City Football Club. Craig was an engineer and also served as a Conservative councillor.

== Early life and career ==
Douglas Malcolm Craig was born on 10 July 1929 in Broughty Ferry, a suburb of Dundee, in Scotland. He attended Grove Academy in Broughty Ferry before graduating with a degree in engineering from the University of St Andrews. He arrived in York in 1964 to work as a consulting engineer, and was elected to York City Council as a Conservative councillor in May 1970. Craig was appointed to the board of York City Football Club on 24 August 1978, and was appointed an Officer of the Order of the British Empire (OBE) in the 1981 Birthday Honours for political and public service.

== York City ==
=== Early years ===
Craig succeeded Michael Sinclair as chairman of York City on 30 June 1991. He enjoyed success under the guidance of manager John Ward and, later, Alan Little, York enjoyed their best period in recent years. The club won promotion to what was then the English Second Division (now League One) in 1993 before making headlines with its giant-killing cup exploits, beating Manchester United over two legs in the League Cup. The cup glory continued the following year. Craig earned national notoriety in 1994 by becoming the only chairman to refuse to sign up to the "Let's Kick Racism Out of Football" campaign.

=== Latter years; sell off and results ===
The following years under Craig were bleak for York, with relegation to Division Three and managers coming and going.

In July 1999, Craig wrote to all York City's shareholders, asking them to approve a plan to transfer the club, and Bootham Crescent, to a new company, Bootham Crescent Holdings (BCH). Craig pointed out that he and his three fellow directors, John Quickfall, Colin Webb and the former playing hero Barry Swallow, owned 94 per cent of the shares and had already approved the plan. This sent York into serious financial turmoil, and the club went into administration shortly after Craig had sold it, minus all fixed assets, to John Batchelor for a fee rumoured to be £50.

York City was later rescued by a trust, which had been set up by the club's supporters. Craig sold the ground back to the Supporter's Trust, but for a figure that was many times larger than the reputed £50,000 that he reputedly paid for the club, many years earlier.

In 2002, Douglas Craig was on a 3 man FA panel that overruled the Football League's decision that had prevented Wimbledon moving to Milton Keynes. On appeal, The Football League allowed Wimbledon to relocate to Milton Keynes in 2003.

== Personal life and death ==
Craig was married to Elizabeth, with whom he had three sons and a daughter. He died on 10 May 2025, at the age of 95.
