= Tony Canham =

English footballer

Personal information
- Full name: Anthony Canham
- Date of birth: 8 June 1960 (age 66)
- Place of birth: Leeds, England
- Height: 5 ft 8 in (1.73 m)
- Position: Winger

Senior career*
Years	Team	Apps	(Gls)
1984–1985	Harrogate Railway		
1985–1995	York City	347	(57)
1995–1996	Hartlepool United	29	(1)
- * Club domestic league appearances and goals

Anthony Canham (born 8 June 1960) is an English former footballer who made more than 350 appearances in the Football League, mostly for York City.

== Honours ==
York City

- Football League Third Division play-offs: 1993
