= Steve Beck (chairman) =

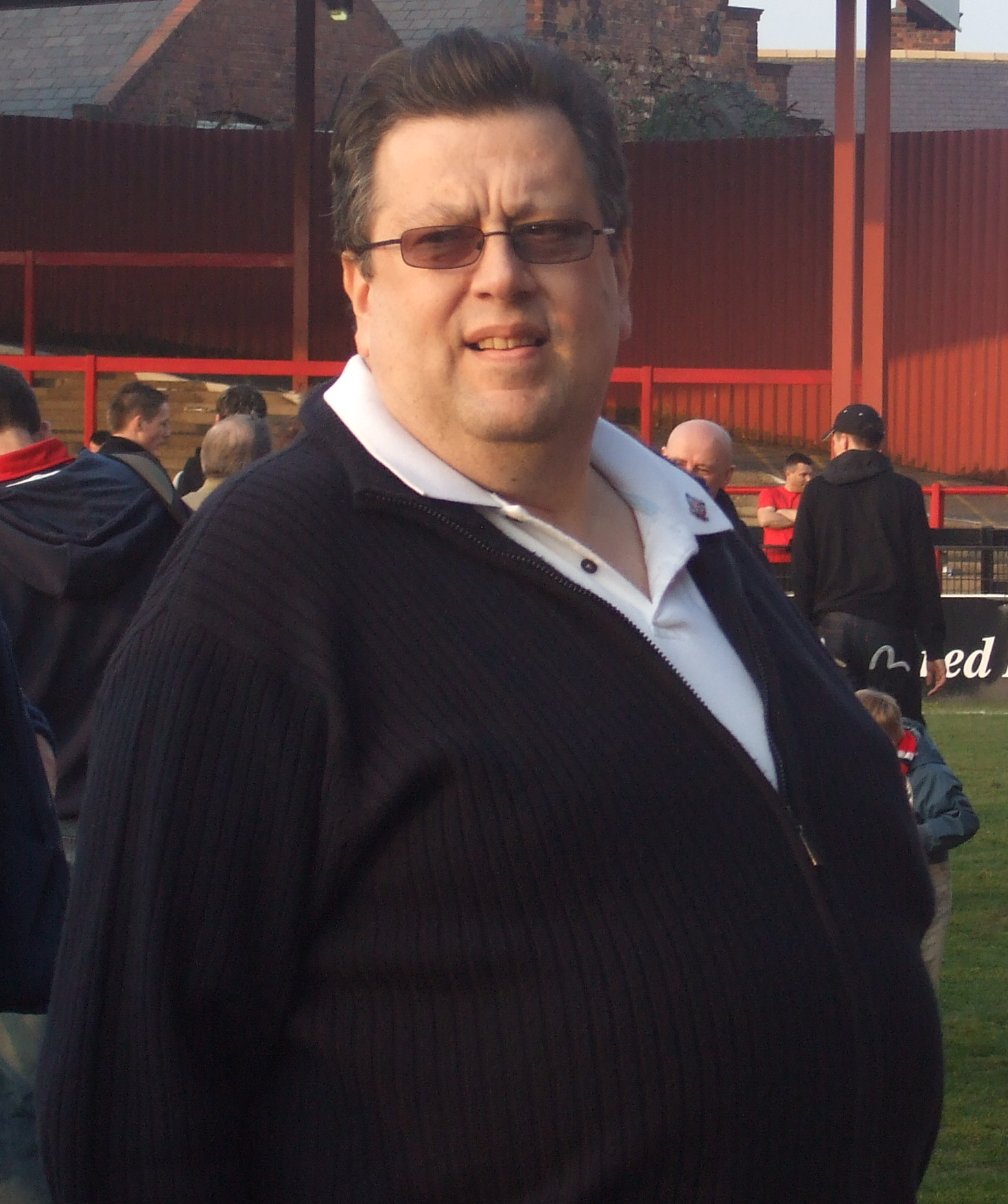
Beck attending a York City match in 2009

Stephen Charles "Steve" Beck (31 March 1957 – 17 April 2015) was a chairman of York City Football Club, a position he held from 2003 to 2004.

== Football ==
Stephen Charles Beck was born on 31 March 1957. He was amongst the first elected members of the board of directors of the York City Supporters' Trust. He was appointed as a director of York City on 15 March 2003 by the Supporters' Trust and following the completion of their takeover of the club on 26 March, he took over as chairman. He resigned in September 2004, with Jason McGill taking the position of managing director, while Beck became youth development and fans' liaison director. He worked as a representative on the board for the Trust before he resigned in January 2009, although remaining as chairman of the Supporters' Trust.

== Personal life ==
He ran a bookkeeping business and a bed and breakfast with his wife Carol, who supported him with his duties at York. He died aged 58 on 17 April 2015 at York Hospital following a long battle with heart problems.
