= Gary Swann =

English footballer

Personal information
- Full name: Gary Swann
- Date of birth: 11 April 1962 (age 64)
- Place of birth: York, England
- Height: 5 ft 9 in (1.75 m)
- Positions: Full back; midfielder

Youth career
- 1978–1980: Hull City

Senior career*
Years	Team	Apps	(Gls)
1980–1986	Hull City	186	(9)
1986–1992	Preston North End	199	(37)
1992–1994	York City	82	(4)
1994–1995	Scarborough	27	(3)
Total		494	(53)

Managerial career
- 2002–?: Cuckfield Town
- * Club domestic league appearances and goals

Gary Swann (born 11 April 1962) is an English former professional footballer.

== Career ==
Born in York, Yorkshire, Swann started his career as a trainee with Hull City. In eight years at Boothferry Park Swann became a regular in the Hull team appearing 221 games for the club, scoring 10 goals, helping the club promotion in both the 1982–83 and 1984-85 seasons.

It was in November 1986 Preston North End boss John McGrath offered City £10,000 to sign Swann. During his time at Deepdale Swann was usually deployed in midfield, becoming an integral member of the Preston team, helping the club to promotion as runners up from the Fourth Division in his first season.

A hard working and often unsung player, Swann also had an uncanny knack of scoring important goals from either his usual midfield position or from full back; his biggest haul of 14 (12 in the league) in 1987–88 season helping keep Preston in the Third Division. Likened to former Liverpool full back Chris Lawler his goalscoring prowess also earned him the nickname "The Ghost" from Preston manager McGrath due to his ability to appear almost unnoticed at the far post to score, something that soon became his trademark. He was also an ever-present in both the 1987–88 and 1989–90 seasons, finishing runner-up in the club's official player of the year awards on both occasions to Bob Atkins and Warren Joyce respectively. In all, Swann played 250 first team games for Preston, scoring 47 goals, quite an achievement in a side that generally hovered around the wrong end of the league table.

At the end of the 1991–92 season, he was released and immediately signed for home town club York City.He helped them to promotion in his first season by scoring the winner in the 2nd leg of their semi final against Bury and then scoring the opening goal in the Third Division play-off final against Crewe Alexandra at Wembley Stadium, a game City won on penalties after drawing 1–1. He also impressed in his second season with the club, helping York reach the play-offs yet again, where they were knocked out in the semi-final.

After a highly successful two years at Bootham Crescent, in which he played 95 games, scoring six goals, he moved on to Scarborough (35 games four goals) for a season before playing in Hong Kong and finally returning to England so as to extend his playing career in non-League football.

In all Swann played 601 first team games scoring 67 goals.

== After football ==
Gary now works as a leisure centre manager at Coral Reef, Bracknell. He previously worked as the manager at Guildford Spectrum leisure complex Surrey.

== Honours ==
Hull City

- Football League Third Division third-place promotion: 1984–85
- Football League Fourth Division second-place promotion: 1982–83
- Associate Members' Cup runner-up: 1983–84

Preston North End

- Football League Fourth Division second-place promotion: 1986–87

York City

- Football League Third Division play-offs: 1993
