= Alan Little (footballer) =

English footballer and manager (1955–2024)

Personal information
- Full name: Alan Little
- Date of birth: 5 February 1955
- Place of birth: Horden, England
- Date of death: 8 August 2024 (aged 69)
- Position: Midfielder

Youth career
- 1971–1973: Aston Villa

Senior career*
Years	Team	Apps	(Gls)
1973–1974	Aston Villa	3	(0)
1974–1977	Southend United	103	(12)
1977–1979	Barnsley	91	(14)
1979–1982	Doncaster Rovers	85	(11)
1982–1983	Torquay United	51	(4)
1983–1985	Halifax Town	68	(6)
1985–1986	Hartlepool United	12	(1)
Total		413	(48)

Managerial career
- 1993–1999: York City
- 1999–2000: Southend United
- 2001–2002: Halifax Town
- * Club domestic league appearances and goals

Alan Little (5 February 1955 – 8 August 2024) was an English professional footballer and manager. He played as a midfielder. Little made over 400 appearances in his senior career, with the most caps coming with Southend United and Barnsley. Little then went on to manage from 1993 to 2002, with seven seasons coming with York City.

== Playing career ==
Alan Little was born in Horden, County Durham. He served his apprenticeship at Aston Villa and, alongside his brother, Brian, was in the youth side which beat Liverpool to win the FA Youth Cup in 1972. He turned professional in January 1973 and on 5 October 1974, made his full league debut, a 2–1 win away to Oldham Athletic. This was the first of just three league appearances for Villa.

In December 1974, he was sold to Southend United for £10,000. The following season, he was a regular in the side that reached the fifth round of the FA Cup. He made 102 full appearances (+ 1 as a substitute). He scored 12 goals for 'the Shrimpers'. In August 1977, Barnsley paid £6,000 to take him to Oakwell, where he played 91 times, scoring 14 goals. December 1979 saw Little on the move again, this time to Doncaster Rovers, who paid a club record £25,000 for his services.

He provided the experience that Billy Bremner's young side needed. He became a great favourite with the Doncaster fans, winning the supporters' Player of the Year award before moving to Torquay United in October 1982 in a deal that saw Clive Wigginton move in the opposite direction. He scored four times in 51 games for Torquay, leaving to join Halifax Town in November 1983, playing 68 times (and scoring six goals) for 'the Shaymen' before joining Hartlepool United as player-coach in July 1985.

Throughout his playing career, Little earned a reputation as a fiercely competitive, tough-tackling midfielder, making him highly respected by supporters and fellow players.

== Coaching and managerial career ==
Little was forced to retire due to injury in May 1986 and stayed at Hartlepool, where he was allowed to coach the juniors. He was later appointed assistant to the manager John Bird. When Bird became the manager at York City in September 1988, Little went with him as assistant manager. In October 1991, after an unsuccessful three years, Bird was sacked. The new manager, John Ward, retained Little as his assistant. Under Ward, York became a stronger side and in the 1992–93 season made a push for promotion. However, in March 1993, Ward left to manage Bristol Rovers, leaving Little in charge.

His first game as York manager was a 5–1 win away to promotion rivals Barnet. York eventually finished fourth in the Third Division and had to settle for a play-off place. After a 1–0 aggregate win over Bury in the semi-finals, York gained a place in Second Division by beating Crewe Alexandra on a penalty shoot-out at Wembley Stadium.

York almost repeated the feat the following season but was beaten in the Second Division play-off semi-finals by Stockport County. There were other highlights during Little's time at York, most notably the League Cup wins over Manchester United in 1995 and Everton in 1996. However, York's overall form under Little deteriorated, and after ten games without victory, he was sacked on 15 March 1999. York were relegated that season having only dropped into the relegation zone on the last day of the season.

In April 1999, Little returned to his old club, Southend United, after the resignation of Alvin Martin, helping them to avoid the drop into the Football Conference at the end of the season. He also helped them survive a serious financial crisis by slashing the wage bill and rebuilding a much cheaper side. His dismissal on 28 September 2000 came as a surprise as, despite a poor start to the season, it came after a five-game unbeaten run that saw 'the Shrimpers' rise to 10th in the Third Division. He was replaced by David Webb on 2 October 2000.

In June 2001, he was appointed Chief Scout at Hull City, managed by his older brother Brian. On 12 October 2001, Little was appointed as manager of former club Halifax Town. With only three league wins before falling ill with appendicitis in March 2002, Little was sacked. Halifax was relegated to the Conference at the end of the season and went out of business six years later.

== Death ==
Little died on 8 August 2024, at the age of 69.

== Managerial statistics ==
Managerial record by team and tenure
Team	From	To	Record					Ref
Team	From	To	P	W	D	L	Win %	Ref
York City	12 March 1993	15 March 1999	328	113	89	126	34.5	
Southend United	2 April 1999	28 September 2000	69	21	18	30	30.4	
Halifax Town	12 October 2001	1 March 2002	27	3	9	15	11.1	
Total			424	137	116	171	32.3	—

== Honours ==
=== As a manager ===
York City

- Football League Third Division play-offs: 1993
