= John Ward (footballer, born 1951) =

English footballer and manager (born 1951)

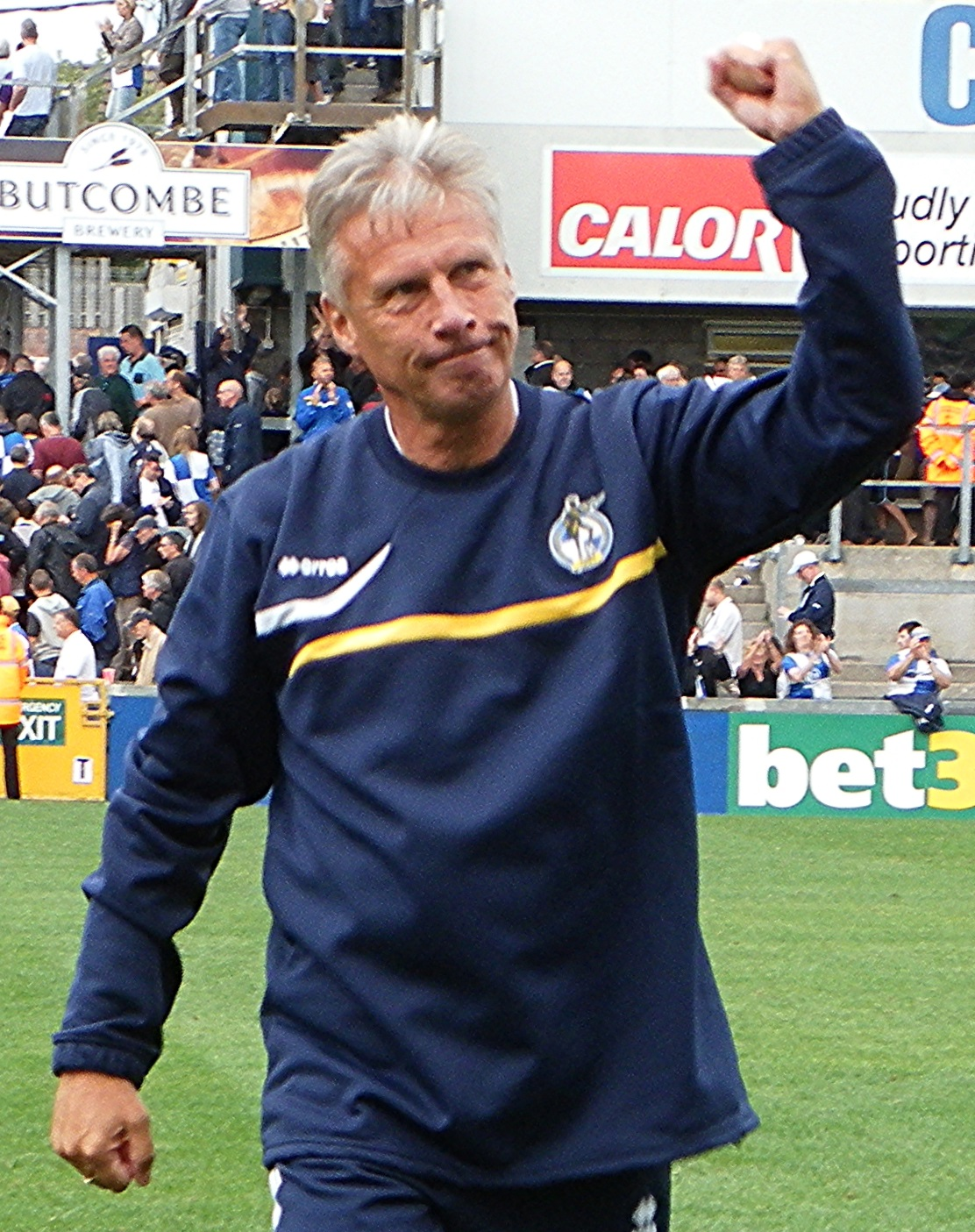
- Ward as manager of Bristol Rovers in 2013

Personal information
- Full name: John Patrick Ward
- Date of birth: 7 April 1951 (age 75)
- Place of birth: Lincoln, Lincolnshire, England
- Height: 5 ft 8 in (1.73 m)
- Position: Forward

Senior career*
Years	Team	Apps	(Gls)
1970–1979	Lincoln City	240	(91)
1972	→ Workington (loan)	11	(3)
1979–1981	Watford	27	(6)
1981–1982	Grimsby Town	3	(0)
1982	Lincoln City	1	(0)
Total		282	(100)

Managerial career
- 1991–1993: York City
- 1993–1996: Bristol Rovers
- 1997–1998: Bristol City
- 2000–2001: Wolverhampton Wanderers (caretaker)
- 2003–2007: Cheltenham Town
- 2007–2008: Carlisle United
- 2010–2012: Colchester United
- 2012–2014: Bristol Rovers
- 2015: Walsall (caretaker)
- * Club domestic league appearances and goals

John Patrick Ward (born 7 April 1951) is an English football manager and retired player.

A forward during his playing days, Ward appeared in the Football League for Lincoln City, Workington, Watford and Grimsby Town, in which he scored 100 goals in 282 appearances. Having served under Graham Taylor at Watford and Aston Villa as assistant manager, he went on to manage York City and Bristol Rovers before being appointed as assistant at Burnley. Time in charge at Bristol City followed and he then served as assistant at Wolverhampton Wanderers. Ward went on to manage at Cheltenham Town, Carlisle United and Colchester United over a nine-year period before returning to Bristol Rovers, initially as manager before, briefly, becoming the club's Director of Football.

== Playing career ==
As a player, Ward spent the bulk of his career as a forward at Lincoln City where he scored more than 100 goals between 1970 and 1979. He also had spells at Watford, Grimsby Town and Workington.

== Managerial career ==
Following his retirement from playing, Ward was assistant manager to Graham Taylor at Watford from 1982 and then followed Taylor to Aston Villa in 1987. After Taylor became England manager in 1990, Ward remained at Villa for a further year and a half under Jozef Venglos and then Ron Atkinson.

=== York City ===
In late 1991, Ward heard that York City, then a struggling fourth division club, had just sacked their manager. He happened to mention to his former boss Taylor in a phone call that he felt York would be a good club to start his own managerial career at, and Taylor in turn contacted the York City board (who had been considering appointing Billy McEwan as manager) and recommended that they hire Ward, which they did. After his appointment, Ward turned York around and in the 1992–93 season and had them challenging for automatic promotion for much of the season. He left before the season ended, and promotion via the play-offs was achieved by his successor, Alan Little.

=== Bristol Rovers and City ===
He later managed both Bristol clubs, Bristol Rovers and Bristol City, and was assistant to Adrian Heath at Burnley.

In 1998 Ward became assistant manager to Colin Lee at Wolverhampton Wanderers. After Lee's departure, he had a brief spell as caretaker manager before reverting to assistant under Dave Jones. He helped the club win promotion to the Premier League in 2003 but left the club at the end of the season.

=== Cheltenham Town ===
Ward was appointed Cheltenham Town manager in November 2003 and in 2006 guided the club to promotion into League One.

=== Carlisle United ===
After keeping the Robins in League One the following season, he moved to Carlisle United in October 2007. Ward guided the club to a play-off position in his first season in charge, despite this however, a poor start to the 2008–09 campaign saw him under heavy pressure to resign. He was later given the backing of the Carlisle board. However, he eventually parted company with the club by mutual consent on 3 November.

Ward applied for the vacant Swindon Town managerial role in November after Maurice Malpas left the club by mutual consent. He held preliminary talks with Port Vale over their managerial vacancy in May 2009, and was the favourite for the job, however lost out to Micky Adams. Ward was then appointed as Stockport County's assistant manager after the appointment of Gary Ablett as Stockport boss.

=== Colchester United ===
Ward became the assistant manager at Colchester United in September 2009 when Aidy Boothroyd was appointed as the club's manager. Boothroyd resigned from his position in May 2010 to join Coventry City which allowed Ward to take charge at the end of the month. Colchester finished tenth in their 2010–11 League One campaign and were tenth again at the end of the following season. He was sacked in September 2012 after the club began the new season without a win in nine league and cup games, leaving them near the bottom of the table. "So much of Colchester United is better than it has ever been," said chairman Robbie Cowling, "but sadly that is not being reflected in first team results."

=== Second spell at Bristol Rovers ===
Ward was appointed as manager of Bristol Rovers for a second time in December 2012. Having signed a contract until the end of the 2012–13 season, he succeeded Mark McGhee to become the club's fourth manager in two years. Ward told BBC Radio Bristol that "I've got an affinity here that once I was asked to come and help I said yes."

His first match in charge was on 26 December 2012, a 2–2 draw against Aldershot Town. Ward gained his first victory in charge in his second game winning 2–1 at home against rivals Plymouth Argyle (he had looked set and was actually en route to become Director of Football at Argyle before being appointed by Rovers). Having taken over with Rovers second from bottom and in the relegation places from the Football League, he achieved a 50% win ratio, with 42 points from 23 games, to guide them to a comfortable mid-table finish for the 2012–13 season.

His second season in charge proved more difficult as Rovers again struggled for form despite being among the pre-season favourites. On 28 March 2014, Ward was replaced as manager by his assistant Darrell Clarke and took up the role of Director of Football at the club. Following the club's relegation out of the Football League for the first time since their election in 1920, Ward was sacked as Director of Football, just 41 days into the role.

== Managerial statistics ==
As of 18 December 2015.

Team	From	To	Record				
Team	From	To	G	W	D	L	Win %
York City	1 October 1991	1 March 1993	70	22	24	24	31.43
Bristol Rovers	1 August 1993	10 May 1996	155	65	42	48	41.94
Bristol City	27 March 1997	28 October 1998	84	38	19	27	45.24
Wolverhampton Wanderers (caretaker)	18 December 2000	3 January 2001	4	3	0	1	75.00
Cheltenham Town	6 November 2003	2 October 2007	207	76	54	77	36.71
Carlisle United	2 October 2007	3 November 2008	62	26	13	23	41.94
Colchester United	31 May 2010	24 September 2012	111	33	39	39	29.73
Bristol Rovers	17 December 2012	28 March 2014	69	24	21	24	34.78
Walsall (caretaker)	30 November 2015	18 December 2015	3	2	1	0	66.67
Total			763	288	212	263	37.75

== Honours ==
=== Manager ===
Bristol City

- Football League Second Division runner-up: 1997–98

Cheltenham Town

- Football League Two play-offs: 2006

Individual

- Football League Two Manager of the Month: November 2005
- Football League One Manager of the Month: February 2008, March 2008
