= 1993 Football League play-offs =

Football League play-offs
- Season: 1992–93
- Champions: Swindon Town (First Division); West Bromwich Albion (Second Division); York City (Third Division)
- Matches: 15
- Goals: 47 (3.13 per match)
- Biggest home win: Crewe 5–1 Walsall (Third Division)
- Biggest away win: Walsall 2–4 Crewe (Third Division)
- Highest scoring: Leicester 3–4 Swindon (7 goals)
- Highest attendance: 73,802 – Leicester v Swindon (First Division final)
- Lowest attendance: 6,196 – Crewe v Walsall (Third Division semi-final)
- Average attendance: 21,320

The Football League play-offs for the 1992–93 season were held in May 1993, with the finals taking place at Wembley Stadium in London. The play-off semi-finals were played over two legs and were contested by the teams who finished in 3rd, 4th, 5th and 6th place in the Football League First Division and Football League Second Division and the 4th, 5th, 6th, and 7th placed teams in the Football League Third Division table. The winners of the semi-finals progressed through to the finals, with the winner of these matches gaining promotion for the following season.

== Background ==
The Football League play-offs have been held every year since 1987. They take place for each division following the conclusion of the regular season and are contested by the four clubs finishing below the automatic promotion places.

== First Division ==
Pos	Team	Pld	W	D	L	GF	GA	GD	Pts
3	Portsmouth	46	26	10	10	80	46	+34	88
4	Tranmere Rovers	46	23	10	13	72	56	+16	79
5	Swindon Town	46	21	13	12	74	59	+15	76
6	Leicester City	46	22	10	14	71	64	+7	76

Portsmouth, whose top scorer Guy Whittingham had found the net 42 times in Division One, only missed out on automatic promotion on goal difference. Fourth placed Tranmere Rovers had recorded the highest finish of their history and had yet to play in the top flight of English football. Swindon Town, who finished fifth, had won the playoff final three years earlier but promotion was then withdrawn due to financial irregularities. The last playoff place went to the previous season's beaten finalists, Leicester City.

In the end, it was Leicester and Swindon who went through to the final. Swindon took a 3-0 lead before Leicester clawed back to make it 3-3, only for Paul Bodin to score the winner and deliver top flight football to Swindon for the first time in their history.

Glenn Hoddle's two-year spell as player-manager of Swindon attracted attention of bigger clubs, and soon after this victory he was appointed player-manager of Chelsea, while losers Leicester had now been beaten in all of their six appearances at Wembley.

=== Semi-finals ===
First leg

16 May 1993
13:00

Leicester City	1–0	Portsmouth
Joachim 86'

City Ground, Nottingham
Attendance: 24,538
Referee: Keith Hackett

16 May 1993
14:50

Swindon Town	3–1	Tranmere Rovers
Vickers 2' (o.g.); Mitchell 3'; Maskell 27'		Morrissey 58'

County Ground, Swindon
Attendance: 14,230
Referee: Allan Gunn

Second leg

19 May 1993
19:30

Tranmere Rovers	3–2	Swindon Town
Proctor 45'; Nevin 64'; Irons 83' (pen.)		Moncur 28'; Maskell 81'

Prenton Park, Birkenhead
Attendance: 16,083
Referee: Paul Durkin

Swindon Town won 5–4 on aggregate.

19 May 1993
19:45

Portsmouth	2–2	Leicester City
McLoughlin 51'; Kristensen 72'		Ormondroyd 53'; Thompson 69'

Fratton Park, Portsmouth
Attendance: 25,438
Referee: Roger Milford

Leicester City won 3–2 on aggregate.

=== Final ===
31 May 1993
15:00

Leicester City	3–4	Swindon Town
Joachim 57'; Walsh 68'; Thompson 69'		Hoddle 42'; Maskell 47'; Taylor 53'; Bodin 84' (pen.)

Wembley Stadium, London
Attendance: 73,802
Referee: David Elleray

== Second Division ==
Pos	Team	Pld	W	D	L	GF	GA	GD	Pts
3	Port Vale	46	26	11	9	79	44	+35	89
4	West Bromwich Albion	46	25	10	11	88	54	+34	85
5	Swansea City	46	20	13	13	65	47	+18	73
6	Stockport County	46	19	15	12	81	57	+24	72

=== Semi-finals ===
First leg

16 May 1993
12:00

Stockport County	1–1	Port Vale
Gannon 5' (pen.)		Glover 24'

Edgeley Park, Stockport
Attendance: 7,856
Referee: Alan Wilkie

16 May 1993
15:00

Swansea City	2–1	West Bromwich Albion
McFarlane 50'; Hayes 65'		McFarlane 72' (o.g.)

Vetch Field, Swansea
Attendance: 13,917

Second leg

19 May 1993
19:45

Port Vale	1–0	Stockport County
Foyle 84'

Vale Park, Stoke-on-Trent
Attendance: 12,689
Referee: David Elleray

Port Vale won 2–1 on aggregate.

19 May 1993
19:45

West Bromwich Albion	2–0	Swansea City
Hunt 10'; Hamilton 20'

The Hawthorns, West Bromwich
Attendance: 26,045

West Bromwich Albion won 3–2 on aggregate.

=== Final ===
30 May 1993
15:00

Port Vale	0–3	West Bromwich Albion
		Hunt 66'; Reid 82'; Donovan 90'

Wembley Stadium, London
Attendance: 53,471
Referee: Roger Milford

== Third Division ==
Pos	Team	Pld	W	D	L	GF	GA	GD	Pts
4	York City	46	21	12	9	72	45	+27	75
5	Walsall	46	22	7	13	76	61	+15	73
6	Crewe Alexandra	46	21	7	13	75	56	+19	70
7	Bury	46	18	9	15	63	55	+8	63

=== Semi-finals ===
First leg

16 May 1993
15:00

Bury	0–0	York City

Gigg Lane, Bury
Attendance: 6,520

16 May 1993
15:00

Crewe Alexandra	5–1	Walsall
Naylor 19', 39'; Clarkson 49'; Edwards 50'; Ward 83'		Cecere 38'

Gresty Road, Crewe
Attendance: 6,196

Second leg

19 May 1993
19:45

Walsall	2–4	Crewe Alexandra
Clarke 18'; O'Connor 78'		Naylor 31', 42', 88'; Ward 77'

Bescot Stadium, Walsall
Attendance: 7,398

Crewe Alexandra won 9–3 on aggregate.

19 May 1993
19:45

York City	1–0	Bury
Swann 59'

Bootham Crescent, York
Attendance: 9,206

York City won 1–0 on aggregate.

=== Final ===
29 May 1993
14:30

Crewe Alexandra	1–1 (a.e.t.)	York City
McKearney 119' (pen.)		Swann 104'
Penalties
McKearney (penalty scored); Smith (penalty scored); Whalley (penalty missed); Ward (penalty scored)	3–5	(penalty scored) McCarthy; (penalty scored) Barnes; (penalty scored) Canham; (penalty scored) Pepper; (penalty scored) Hall

Wembley Stadium, London
Attendance: 22,416
Referee: Allan Gunn
