= List of York City F.C. players =

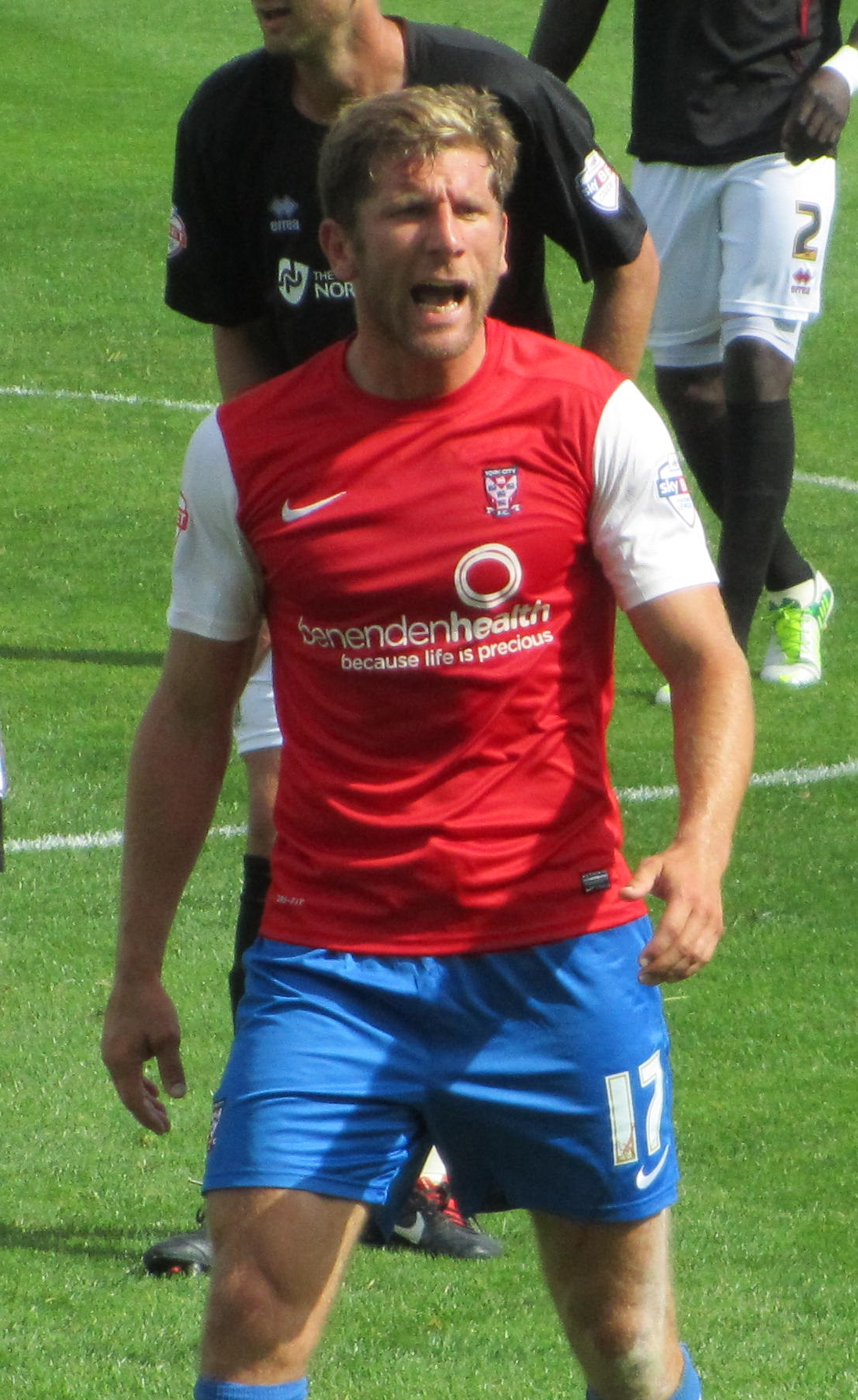
York City received a club record transfer fee of £950,000 when Richard Cresswell signed for Sheffield Wednesday in 1999.

York City Football Club is a professional association football club based in York, North Yorkshire, England. Formed in 1922, York played in the Midland League for seven years before being elected to the Football League ahead of the 1929–30 season. Since that time, the club's first team have competed in numerous competitions, and all players who have played in 100 or more such matches, either as a member of the starting eleven or as a substitute, are listed below.

Each player's details include the duration of his York career, his typical playing position while with the club, and the number of matches played and goals scored in domestic league matches and in all senior competitive matches. Where applicable, the list also includes the national team for which the player was selected, and the number of senior international caps he won.

== Introduction ==
As of the date specified below, 163 men had made 100 or more appearances in senior competitive matches for York. Barry Jackson holds the record for York total and league appearances, having played 539 matches in all competitions and 482 matches in the Football League between 1958 and 1970. He is followed by Andy McMillan, who made 492 total appearances and 421 league appearances from 1987 to 1999. The appearance record for a goalkeeper is held by Tommy Forgan, having played 428 matches between 1954 and 1966. The player who has won the most international caps while at the club is Peter Scott with seven for Northern Ireland from 1976 to 1978.

The goalscoring record is held by Norman Wilkinson, with 127 league goals, and 143 in total, scored between 1954 and 1966. Keith Walwyn came three goals from equalling Wilkinson's total goals record, with 140 goals, including 119 in the league, scored between 1981 and 1987. Jimmy Cowie holds the records for the most league and total goals scored in a season, set in 1928–29, with 49 league goals in as many matches in the Midland League and 56 goals in all competitions. For the Football League-era, the record for most goals in a season is held by Arthur Bottom, who scored 39 in 1954–55.

== Key ==
- The list is ordered first by number of appearances in total, then by number of league appearances, and then if necessary by date of debut.
- Appearances as a substitute are included.
- Statistics are correct up to and including the match played on 21 November 2026. Where a player left the club permanently after this date, his statistics are updated to his date of leaving.

Player
Players marked * were registered for the club as at the date specified above.
Players with name in italics and marked † were on loan from another club for the duration of their York career. The loaning club is noted in the Notes column.
Players marked ‡ have won the York City Clubman of the Year award.

Positions key
Pre-1960s		1960s–	
GK	Goalkeeper		
FB	Full-back	DF	Defender
HB	Half-back	MF	Midfielder
FW	Forward		
U	Utility player		

Position
Playing positions are listed according to the tactical formations that were employed at the time. Thus the change in the names of defensive and midfield positions reflects the tactical evolution that occurred from the 1960s onwards.
Club career
Club career is defined as the first and last calendar years in which the player appeared for the club in any of the competitions listed below.
League appearances and league goals
League appearances and goals comprise those in the Midland League, the Football League and the Football Conference/National League. Appearances in the 1939–40 Football League season, abandoned after three matches because of the Second World War, are excluded.
Total appearances and total goals
Total appearances and goals comprise those in the Midland League, Football League (including play-offs), Football Conference/National League (including play-offs), FA Cup, Football League Third Division North Cup, Football League Cup, Associate Members' Cup/Football League Trophy/EFL Trophy, FA Trophy and Conference Cup/Conference League Cup. Matches in wartime competitions are excluded.
International selection
Countries are listed only for players who have been selected for international football. Only the highest level of international competition is given, except where a player competed for more than one country, in which case the highest level reached for each country is shown.
Caps
For players having played at full international level, the caps column counts the number of such appearances during his career with the club.

== Players with 100 or more appearances ==
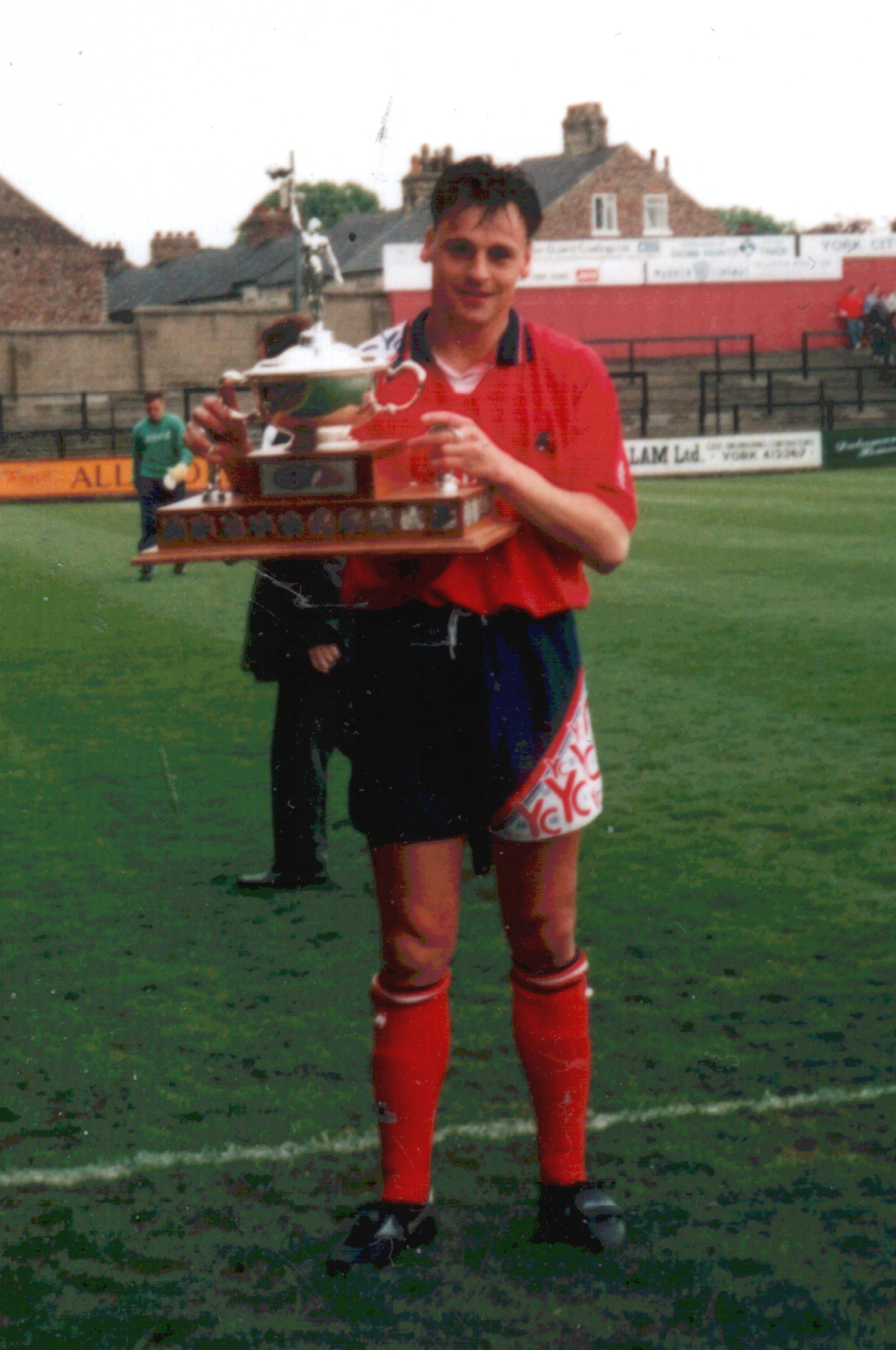
Paul Barnes, who was York City's top scorer in each of his four seasons at the club, won the Clubman of the Year award for 1993–94.

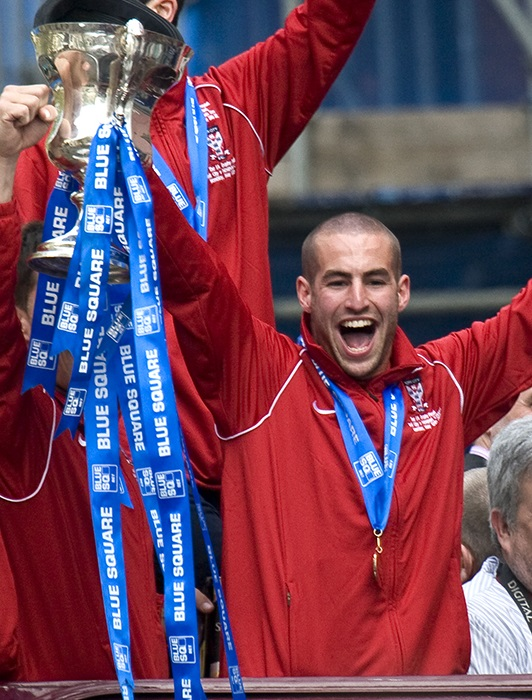
Matty Blair scored the winning goal for York in the 2012 Conference Premier play-off final.

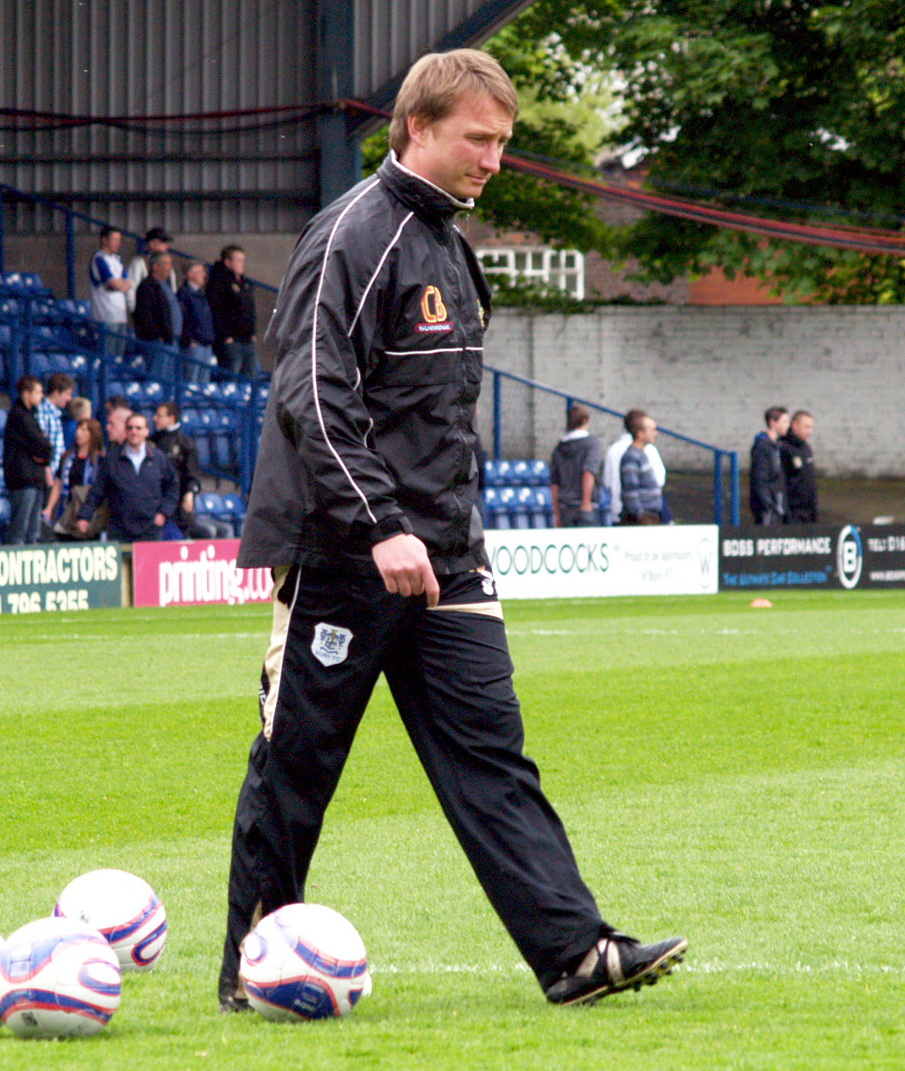
Chris Brass was player-manager from 2003 to 2004, in which time the club was relegated to the Conference National.

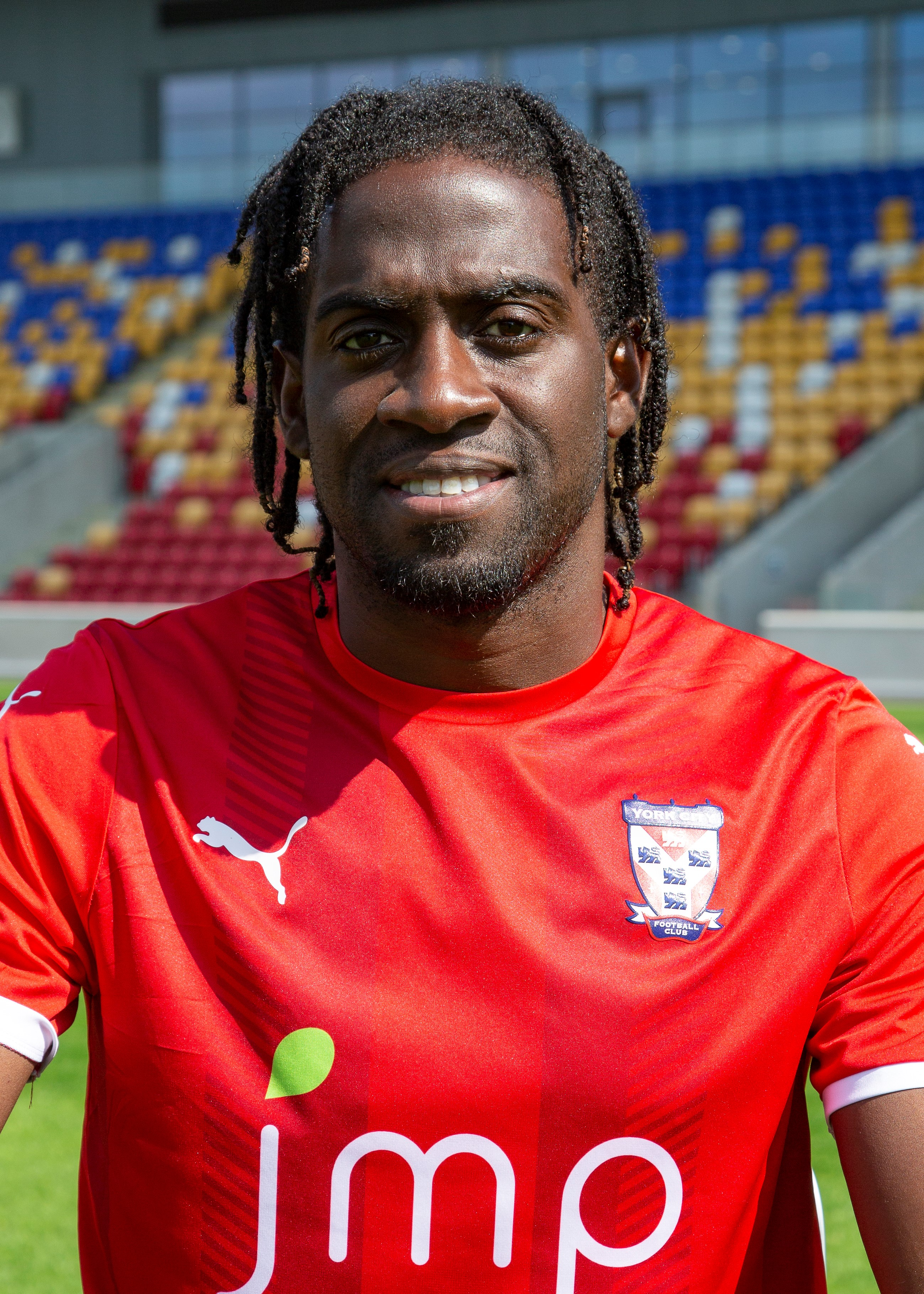
Clayton Donaldson was voted Clubman of the Year in the 2005–06 season and was top scorer in 2006–07.

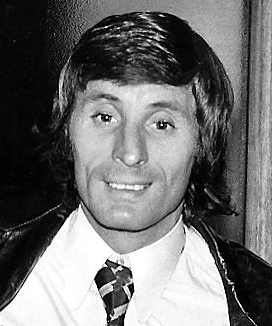
Wally Gould was noted for his speed while playing on the wing for York from 1961 to 1963.

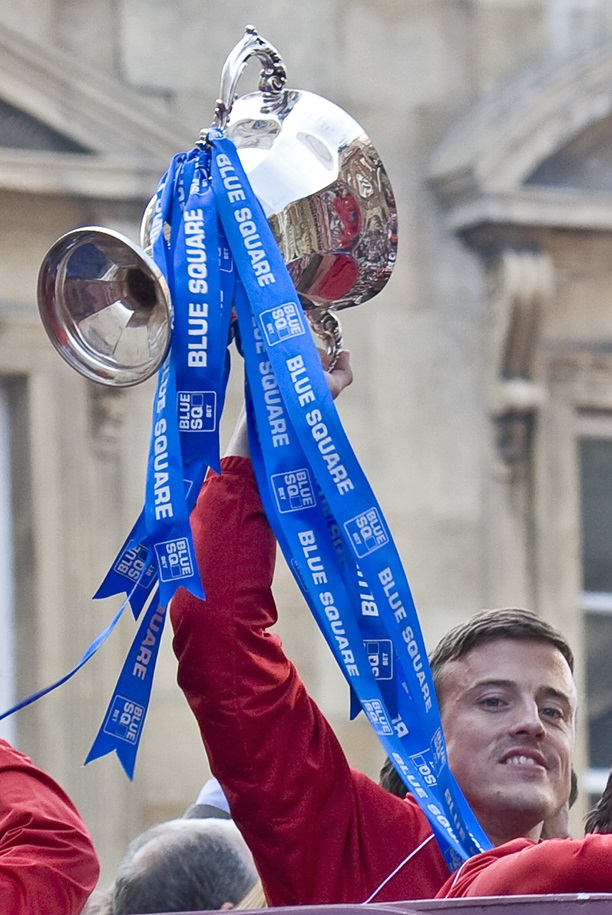
Michael Ingham is the second highest appearing goalkeeper in York's history behind Tommy Forgan.

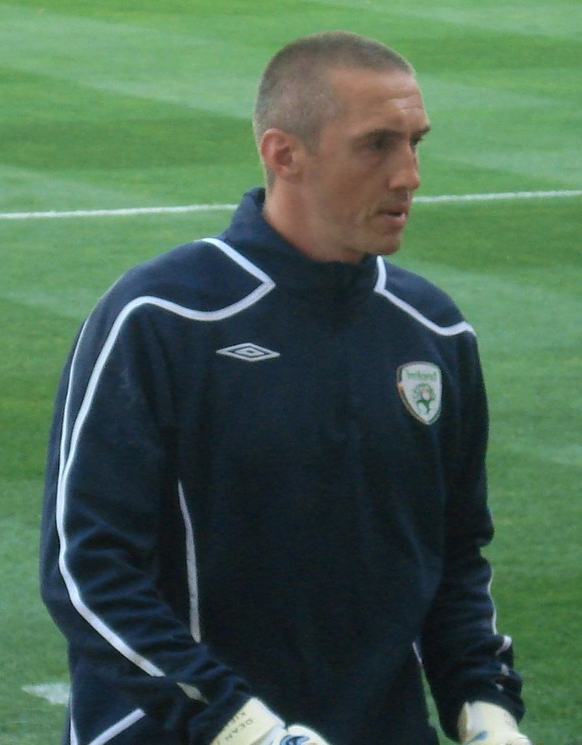
Dean Kiely played in goal in York's penalty shoot-out victory over Crewe Alexandra in the 1993 Third Division play-off final.

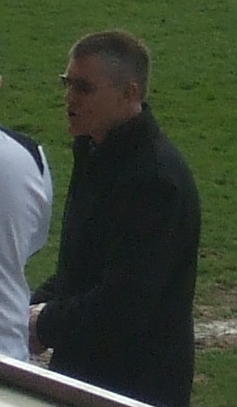
John Mackin was a key figure in the York team that won promotion to the Third Division in the 1970–71 season.

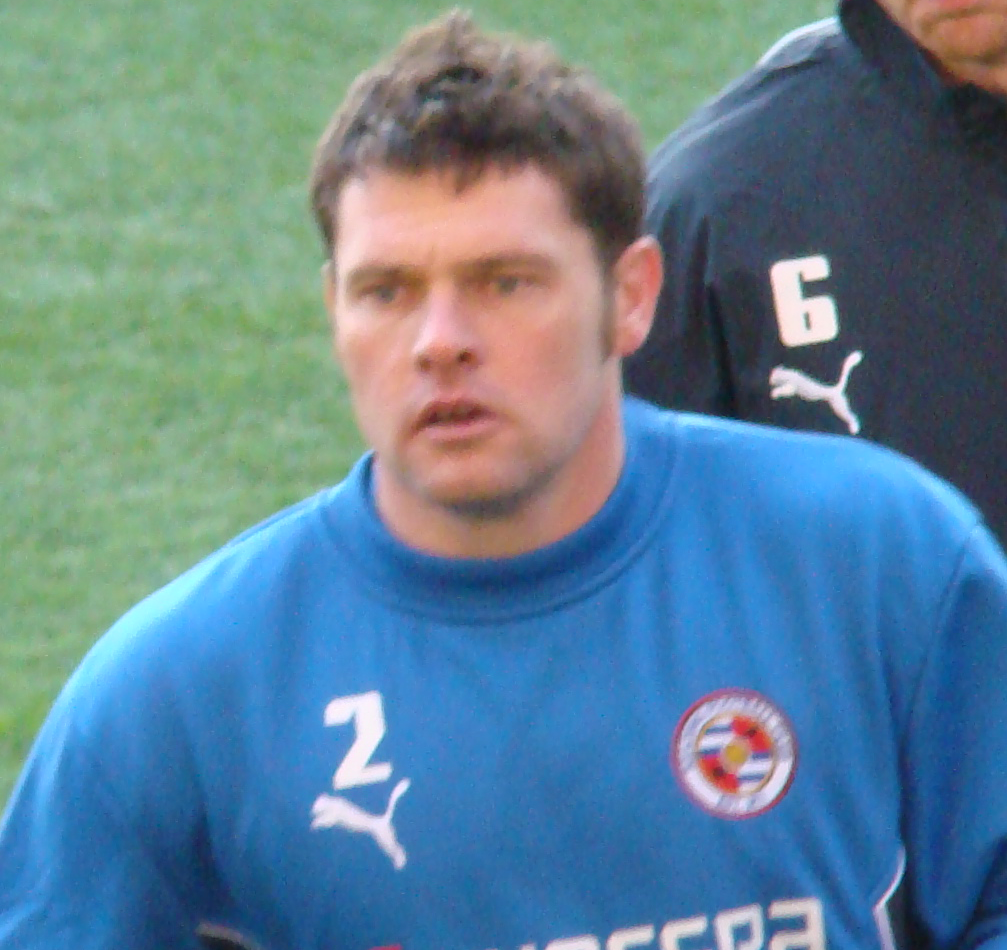
Graeme Murty signed for Reading for a transfer fee of £700,000 in 1998.

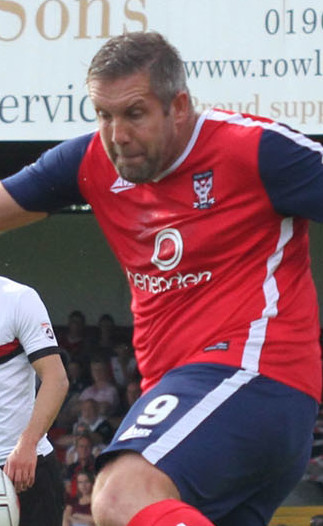
Jon Parkin scored the opening goal as York beat Macclesfield Town in the 2017 FA Trophy final.

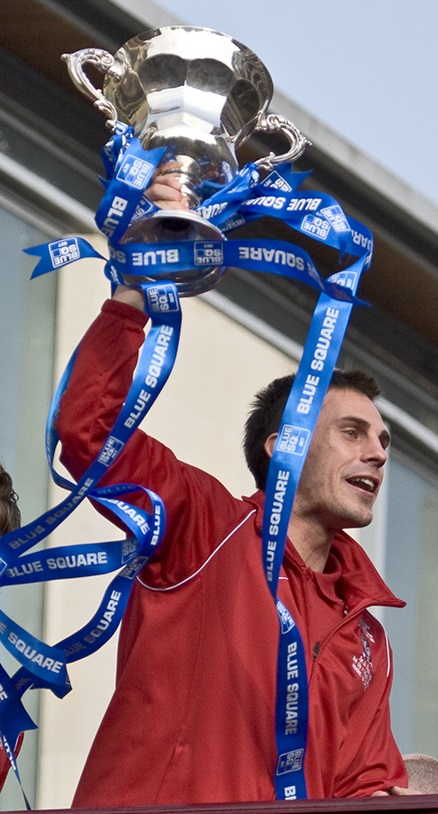
Chris Smith captained the York team that won the 2011–12 FA Trophy and the 2012 Conference Premier play-offs.

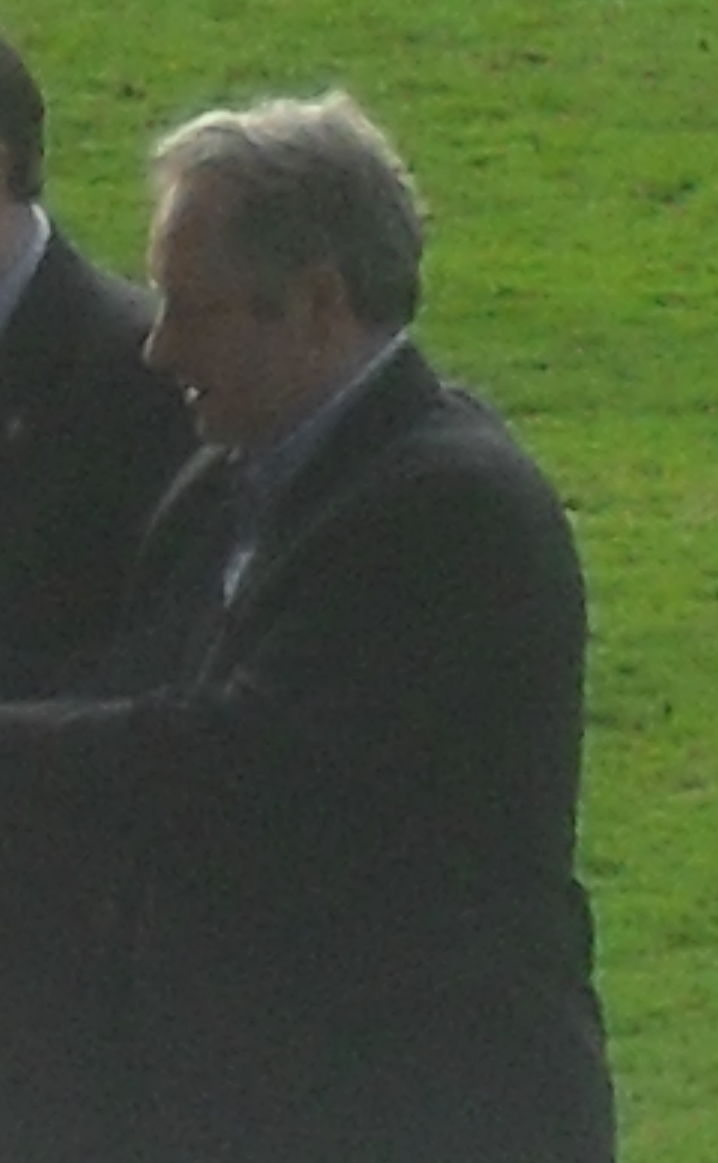
Gordon Staniforth was voted Clubman of the Year in successive seasons, winning the award in 1977–78 and 1978–79.

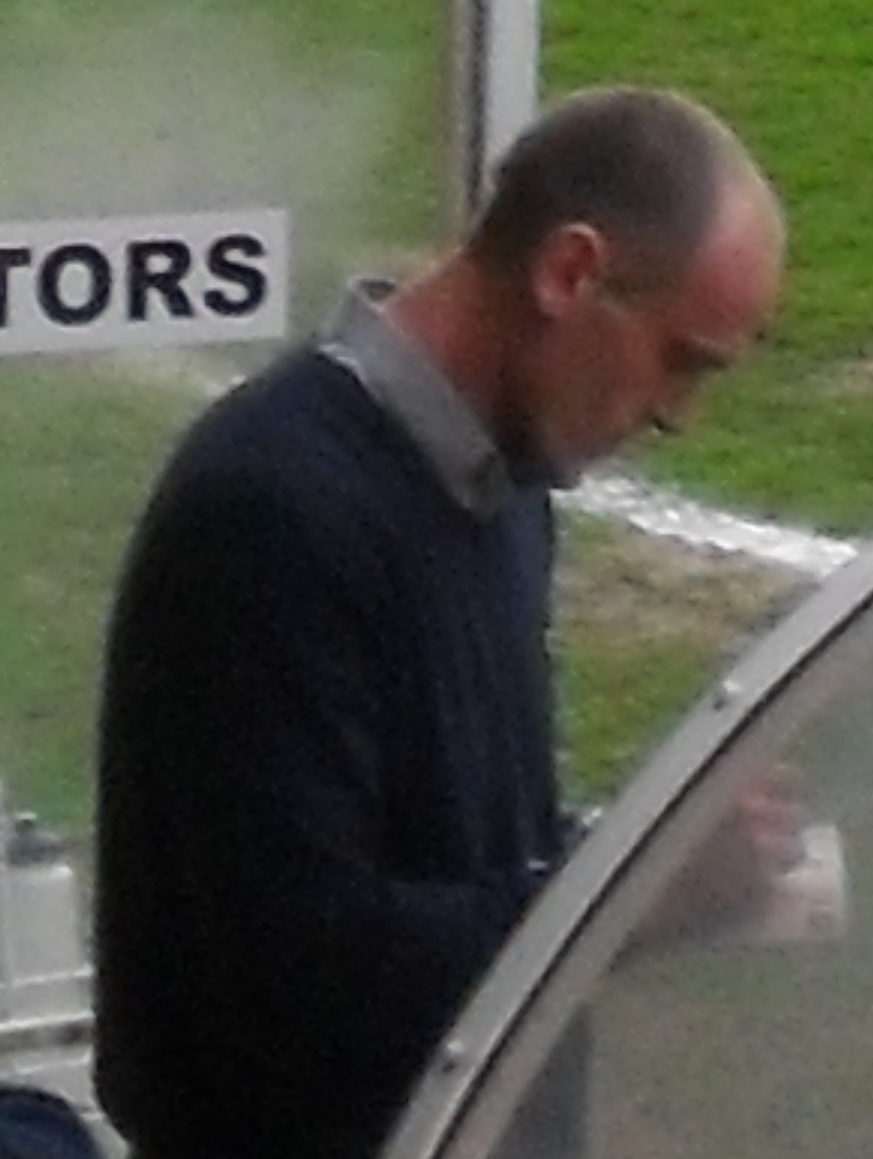
Steve Tutill made 366 appearances for York between 1987 and 1997.

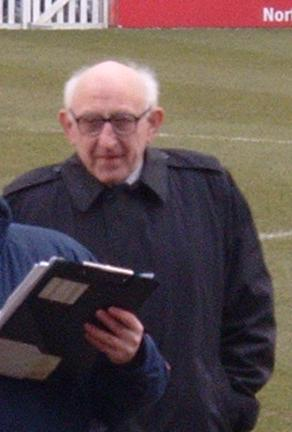
Norman Wilkinson is York's record goalscorer with 143 goals in a 12-year career with the club.

Table of players, including playing position, club statistics and international selection
Player	Pos	Club career	League		Total		International selection	Caps	Notes	Ref
Player	Pos	Club career	Apps	Goals	Apps	Goals	International selection	Caps	Notes	Ref
Barry Jackson	DF	1958–1970	482	9	539	10	—	—	(Note: Jackson holds the club record for the most total appearances for York City. He also holds the club record for the most league matches.)	
Andy McMillan ‡	DF	1987–1999	421	5	492	5	—	—		
Chris Topping ‡	DF	1968–1978	412	11	463	13	—	—		
Wayne Hall	DF	1989–2001	373	9	438	11	—	—		
Gary Ford	MF	1978–1987	366	53	435	64	—	—		
Tommy Forgan	GK	1954–1966	388	0	428	0	—	—	(Note: Forgan has played more matches in goal for York City than anyone else.)	
Tony Canham	MF	1985–1995	347	57	413	70	—	—		
Norman Wilkinson	FW	1954–1966	354	127	401	143	—	—	(Note: Wilkinson holds the club record for the most total goals for York City. He also holds the club record for the most league goals.)	
Phil Burrows ‡	DF	1966–1974	337	14	390	15	—	—		
Daniel Parslow ‡	DF	2006–2013; 2017–2019	318	5	382	6	Wales semi-pro	—	(Note: Cheltenham Town)	
Billy Hughes	FW	1951–1961	349	55	380	58	—	—		
Steve Tutill ‡	DF	1987–1997	301	6	366	7	England schools	—		
Sid Storey	FW	1947–1956	330	40	354	42	—	—		
Derek Hood ‡	DF / MF	1980–1988	300	32	354	36	—	—		
Gordon Brown	FW / HB	1950–1958	322	25	351	25	—	—		
George Howe	FB	1954–1961	307	0	338	0	—	—		
David McGurk ‡	DF	2004–2014	284	6	332	6	—	—	(Note: Darlington)	
Michael Ingham ‡	GK	2003; 2008–2016	275	0	328	0	Northern Ireland	0	(Note: Sunderland)	
Barry Swallow	DF	1969–1976	269	21	312	27	—	—	(Note: Player who also managed the club.)	
Ron Spence	HB	1948–1958	280	25	306	26	—	—		
Brian Pollard ‡	MF	1972–1977; 1981–1984	264	60	302	68	England under-18	—		
Peter Wragg	FW / HB	1956–1963	264	78	297	87	England schools	—		
Keith Walwyn ‡	FW	1981–1987	245	119	291	140	—	—		
Nigel Pepper	MF	1990–1997	235	40	281	45	—	—		
Graeme Crawford	GK	1971–1977; 1980	252	0	280	0	—	—		
Billy Fenton	FW	1951–1958	257	118	278	124	—	—	(Note: Bottom holds the club record for the most goals in a season during the Football League-era; 39 in 1954–55. Fenton and Bottom share the club record for the most Football League goals in a season; Fenton scored 31 in 1951–52 and Bottom scored 31 in 1954–55 and 1955–56.)	
Paddy McLaughlin	MF	2011–2013; 2019–2024	225	26	266	29	Northern Ireland under-21	—	(Note: Hartlepool United)	
Matt Patrick	U	1946–1954	248	47	261	48	—	—	(Note: Also played for York City during the Second World War.)	
Jack Middlemas	HB	1923–1929	228	4	259	5	—	—		
Alan Woods	MF	1960–1966	228	4	259	4	England under-18	—		
Ted Wass	FB / HB	1932–1939	222	0	253	0	—	—		
Tom Fenoughty	FW	1927–1934	229	97	252	104	—	—		
Ted Hathway	HB / FW	1933–1939	218	38	250	43	—	—	(Note: Player statistics exclude three matches played in the aborted 1939–40 season.)	
Paul Aimson	FW	1964–1966; 1969–1973	219	98	248	113	—	—		
Alf Patrick	FW	1946–1953	228	109	241	117	—	—	(Note: Patrick holds the club record for the most goals by a York City player in a Football League match. He scored five times in a 6–1 victory against Rotherham United on 20 November 1948.)	
Dean Kiely	GK	1991–1996	210	0	239	0	Republic of Ireland; England under-17	0		
Gerry Baker	DF	1963–1968	214	7	234	9	—	—		
Jon McCarthy ‡	MF	1990–1995; 2002	200	31	234	38	Northern Ireland	0		
Alan Stewart	HB	1949–1956	208	1	231	1	—	—		
Jack Pinder	FB	1932–1948	199	4	229	4	England schools	—		
Chris Smith	DF	2001–2004; 2010–2013	188	7	222	9	—	—	(Note: Mansfield Town)	
John Simpson	FB	1948–1953	207	0	220	0	—	—		
Bert Brenen	U	1939–1951	204	13	218	15	—	—		
Tommy Heron	DF	1961–1966	192	6	216	6	—	—		
Billy Rudd	FW	1962–1966	193	30	212	31	—	—		
Peter Spooner	FW	1931–1933; 1935–1939	189	42	212	48	—	—		
Tony Barras ‡	DF	1994–1999	171	11	206	15	—	—		
Steve Senior	DF	1981–1987	168	6	206	7	—	—		
Lee Bullock	MF	1998–2004; 2012–2013	183	24	202	27	—	—		
Steve Bushell ‡	MF	1991–1998	174	11	201	14	—	—		
John Byrne	FW	1979–1984	175	55	199	64	Republic of Ireland	0		
Ian McDonald ‡	MF	1977–1981	175	29	195	31	—	—		
Scott Jordan	MF	1992–2001	167	12	194	16	—	—		
John Woodward	DF / MF	1971–1977	167	6	191	6	Scotland XI	—		
Sean Newton ‡	DF	2016–2022	159	29	188	33	England C	—	(Note: Wrexham)	
John Mackin	DF	1969–1973	160	7	184	8	—	—		
Gary Himsworth	U	1987–1990; 1996–1998	157	11	184	13	—	—		
Richard Brodie	FW	2007–2010; 2016	152	58	184	76	England C	—		
Lee Nogan	FW	2001–2005	165	35	183	37	Wales	0		
Ernie Phillips	FB	1954–1958	164	2	183	2	—	—		
Jimmy Seal	FW	1972–1976	161	43	183	48	—	—		
Roy Kay	DF	1978–1982	160	8	183	8	—	—		
Ian Helliwell ‡	FW	1987–1991	160	40	183	48	—	—		
Alan Hay	DF	1982–1986; 1988	151	3	182	4	—	—		
Percy Andrews	FB	1947–1954	176	0	181	0	—	—		
Ian Holmes	MF	1973–1977	159	30	180	35	—	—		
Andy Provan	MF	1964–1968	160	49	179	54	Scotland under-18	—		
Sam Ranby	FW	1925–1929	158	40	179	52	—	—		
Paul Atkin	U	1991–1997	153	3	179	3	England under-16	—		
Ricky Sbragia	DF	1982–1987	149	7	179	10	—	—		
Paul Barnes ‡	FW	1992–1996	148	76	179	85	—	—		
Adriano Moke	MF	2011–2012; 2016–2020	149	9	176	9	—	—		
John MacPhail ‡	DF	1983–1986	142	24	173	29	—	—	(Note: Sheffield United)	
Dale Banton ‡	FW	1984–1988	138	49	173	55	—	—		
Sean Haslegrave	MF	1983–1987	142	0	172	0	—	—		
Dennis Walker	FW / MF	1964–1968	154	19	169	19	England schools	—		
Chris Brass ‡	DF	2001–2004	152	6	166	8	—	—		
Chris Marples ‡	GK	1988–1993	138	0	166	0	—	—		
Gordon Staniforth ‡	FW	1976–1979; 1987–1988	147	34	164	40	England schools	—	(Note: Hull City)	
Tony Barratt	DF / MF	1989–1995	147	10	164	10	—	—		
Andy Clements	U	1977–1981	148	6	163	8	—	—		
Jon Parkin ‡	FW	2002–2004; 2016–2019	147	50	162	59	—	—	(Note: Barnsley and Newport County)	
Ryan Fallowfield * ‡	DF	2022–present	147	9	162	9	—	—		
James Meredith	DF	2009–2012	131	3	162	3	Australia	0		
Arthur Bottom	FW	1954–1958	137	92	158	105	—	—		
Jack Fountain	HB	1960–1964	130	3	152	4	—	—		
Stan Fox	FW	1932–1938	136	4	151	5	—	—		
Walter Bingley	DF	1960–1963	130	5	151	5	—	—		
Ian Blackstone	FW	1990–1994	129	37	148	42	—	—		
Ben Purkiss	DF	2007–2010	120	2	148	3	—	—	(Note: Gainsborough Trinity)	
Lenell John-Lewis	FW	2022–2025	132	30	147	39	—	—	(Note: Grimsby Town)	
Darren Edmondson	DF	2000–2004	131	6	147	6	—	—		
Barry Jones ‡	DF	1997–2001	134	5	145	6	—	—	(Note: Wrexham)	
Roger Jones	GK	1982–1985	122	0	141	0	England under-23	—		
Graeme Murty	MF / DF	1993–1998	117	7	141	9	Scotland	0		
Reg Baines	FW	1924–1926; 1931–1933; 1937–1938	129	88	140	93	—	—		
Alan Fettis ‡	GK	2000–2003	125	0	140	0	Northern Ireland	0		
Ashley Chambers	MF	2010–2014	121	21	140	23	England C	—	(Note: Leicester City)	
Clayton Donaldson ‡	FW	2005–2007; 2021–2022	118	49	140	58	Jamaica; England C	0		
Wally Gould	MF	1961–1963	120	25	138	27	—	—		
Norman Wharton	GK	1936–1939	117	0	138	0	—	—		
Sam Johnson	FB	1929–1933	124	0	137	0	—	—		
Billy Allen	HB	1946–1950	130	23	136	24	—	—		
Manny Panther	MF	2005–2008	121	4	136	4	Scotland schools	—		
Olly Dyson ‡	MF	2020–2024	113	7	136	10	England C	—		
Sammy Gledhill	HB	1936–1949	123	6	135	8	—	—		
Ollie Thompson	HB	1929–1932	121	2	133	2	—	—		
Darren Dunning ‡	MF	2003–2006	121	7	131	9	—	—		
Harry Beck	HB	1929–1932	119	12	131	12	—	—		
Graham Potter	DF	2000–2003	114	5	131	8	England under-21	—		
Michael Coulson	MF	2012–2016	117	20	129	23	England C	—		
Glenn Naylor	FW	1990–1996	111	30	129	32	—	—		
Jimmy Hughes	FW	1934–1939	106	30	127	36	—	—		
Callum Howe	DF	2023–2026	116	6	126	6	—	—		
Phil Boyer	FW	1968–1970	109	27	126	34	England	0		
Simon Mills ‡	MF	1985–1987	99	4	126	8	England under-18	—		
Ron Mollatt	HB	1955–1960	124	1	125	1	—	—		
Russell Penn	MF	2014–2016; 2018	112	5	124	5	England C	—		
Richard Cresswell	FW	1996–1999; 2013	106	23	124	26	England under-21	—	(Note: Cresswell holds the club record for the highest transfer fee received by the club; £950,000, which was paid by Sheffield Wednesday on 25 March 1999.)	
Alex Hunt *	MF	2024–present	115	15	123	16	—	—		
Dave Dunmore	FW	1952–1954; 1965–1967	111	38	123	41	—	—		
Shaun Reid	MF	1988–1992	106	7	122	8	—	—		
Steve James	DF	1976–1980	105	1	119	2	England under-18	—		
Gary Howlett	MF	1988–1991	101	13	119	13	Republic of Ireland	0		
Michael Rankine	FW	2009–2011; 2013; 2017	101	22	119	26	—	—	(Note: Aldershot Town)	
Dave Merris ‡	DF	2003–2006	109	2	118	3	—	—		
Kevin Randall	FW	1977–1981	107	27	118	31	—	—		
Ollie Pearce * ‡	FW	2024–present	107	72	118	77	England C	—		
Malcolm Crosby	MF	1981–1985	103	4	117	4	—	—		
Paul Stephenson	MF	1995–1998	97	8	117	9	England under-18	—		
Dan Batty	MF	2023–2026	107	1	116	1	—	—		
Joe Spence	FB / HB	1950–1953	110	0	115	0	—	—		
Peter Scott	DF	1975–1978	100	3	114	3	Northern Ireland; England under-18	7	(Note: Scott holds the club record for the most full international caps won by a player while at York City.)	
Jimmy Walsh	DF	1978–1981	99	2	114	2	—	—		
Jimmy Loughran	HB	1925–1928; 1931	97	12	114	16	—	—		
Chris Evans	DF	1982–1985	96	1	114	1	—	—		
Archie Taylor	MF	1968–1971	96	8	112	9	—	—		
Lanre Oyebanjo ‡	DF	2011–2014; 2016–2017	96	2	112	3	Republic of Ireland under-21	—		
Craig Farrell	FW	2006–2009	91	21	111	27	England under-16	—		
Ray Warburton	DF	1989–1993	90	9	111	11	—	—		
Richard Cooper	MF	2001–2004	100	4	110	4	England under-20	—		
Billy Hodgson	FW	1967–1970	98	3	110	3	—	—		
Rodney Rowe	FW	1997–1999	97	21	110	28	—	—		
Matt Hocking	DF	1999–2002	97	2	110	2	—	—		
Kevin McMahon	FW	1969–1972	93	31	110	35	—	—		
Pete Jameson ‡	GK	2019–2022	89	0	110	0	—	—		
Micky Cave ‡	MF	1974–1977	96	13	109	15	—	—		
Dick Duckworth	HB	1936–1939	88	0	109	0	—	—		
David Ferguson	DF	2017–2020	95	3	108	5	England C	—		
Chris Jones	FW	1973–1975	95	34	107	37	—	—		
Alex Whittle	DF	2016–2017; 2022–2023	93	0	106	0	England schools	—		
Dick Hewitt	FW	1969–1972	91	7	106	9	—	—		
Steve Faulkner	DF	1978–1981	90	7	105	8	—	—		
Johnny Linaker	FW	1950–1951; 1953–1955	98	20	103	20	—	—		
Paul Stancliffe ‡	DF	1991–1994	91	3	103	3	—	—		
Alan Pouton	MF	1996–1999	90	7	103	8	—	—		
Mark Tinkler	MF	1997–1999	90	7	103	7	England under-18	—		
Ian Davidson	MF	1969–1971	86	4	102	8	—	—		
Martyn Woolford	MF	2006–2008	86	22	102	25	England C	—		
Neil Tolson	FW	1996–1999	84	18	102	24	—	—		
Keith Lowe ‡	DF	2013–2015	92	8	101	8	—	—		
Matty Blair	MF	2011–2013	85	16	101	27	England C	—		
Onome Sodje	FW	2007–2009	81	21	101	24	—	—		

== Notes ==
Player statistics include matches played while on loan from:
