= 1956–57 York City F.C. season =

Association football club season

York City F.C.
1956–57 season
- Chairman: Hugh Kitchin
- Manager: Sam Bartram
- Ground: Bootham Crescent
- Football League Third Division North: 7th
- FA Cup: Second round (eliminated by Hull City)
- Top goalscorer: League: Arthur Bottom (21); All: Arthur Bottom (22)
- Highest home attendance: 15,318 vs Workington, Third Division North, 20 August 1956
- Lowest home attendance: 7,203 vs Rochdale, Third Division North, 20 April 1957
- Average home league attendance: 9,414
Home colours

The 1956–57 season was the 34th season of competitive association football and 27th season in the Football League played by York City Football Club, a professional football club based in York, Yorkshire, England. They finished in seventh position in the 24-team 1956–57 Football League Third Division North. They entered the 1956–57 FA Cup in the first round and lost in the second to Hull City.

21 players made at least one appearance in nationally organised first-team competition, and there were nine different goalscorers. Goalkeeper Tommy Forgan and forward Peter Wragg played in all 49 first-team matches over the season. Arthur Bottom finished as leading goalscorer with 22 goals, of which 21 came in league competition and one came in the FA Cup.

== Match details ==
=== Football League Third Division North ===
Football League Third Division North match details
No.	Date	League position	Opponents	Venue	Result	Score F–A	Scorers	Attendance
1	18 August 1956	19th	Accrington Stanley	A	L	0–3		11,026
2	20 August 1956	18th	Workington	H	D	2–2	Monkhouse, Colbridge	15,318
3	25 August 1956	14th	Tranmere Rovers	H	W	1–0	Wragg	12,291
4	29 August 1956	16th	Workington	A	L	2–3	Wilkinson, Wragg pen.	9,542
5	1 September 1956	17th	Halifax Town	A	D	0–0		8,192
6	3 September 1956	12th	Carlisle United	H	W	2–0	Bottom, Fenton	11,709
7	8 September 1956	17th	Oldham Athletic	A	L	1–3	Hughes	8,608
8	15 September 1956	15th	Mansfield Town	H	W	2–0	Colbridge, Fenton	9,835
9	17 September 1956	15th	Chester	H	L	0–1		9,234
10	22 September 1956	17th	Southport	A	D	1–1	Bottom	4,019
11	26 September 1956	14th	Chester	A	W	4–3	Hughes, Wilkinson, Wragg, Fenton	4,258
12	29 September 1956	16th	Chesterfield	H	L	1–2	Bottom	8,820
13	6 October 1956	14th	Hull City	H	W	2–1	Wilkinson, Fenton	10,763
14	13 October 1956	13th	Barrow	A	W	2–1	Brown, Hughes	5,908
15	20 October 1956	14th	Scunthorpe & Lindsey United	H	L	0–2		8,881
16	27 October 1956	14th	Bradford Park Avenue	A	W	2–0	Wilkinson (2)	9,206
17	3 November 1956	12th	Gateshead	H	W	1–0	Wilkinson	7,325
18	10 November 1956	12th	Wrexham	A	D	1–1	Fennton	12,577
19	24 November 1956	13th	Crewe Alexandra	A	D	1–1	Bottom	4,699
20	1 December 1956	11th	Darlington	H	W	1–0	Bottom	8,153
21	15 December 1956	8th	Accrington Stanley	H	W	3–1	Bottom pen., Wilkinson, opposition o.g.	8,161
22	22 December 1956	8th	Tranmere Rovers	A	D	3–3	Bottom, Wilkinson, Wragg	3,045
23	25 December 1956	9th	Hartlepools United	H	D	3–3	Bottom pen., Wilkinson, Fenton	8,663
24	26 December 1956	10th	Hartlepools United	A	L	0–2		6,954
25	29 December 1956	11th	Halifax Town	H	L	1–2	Fenton	8,102
26	1 January 1957	13th	Carlisle United	A	L	0–2		7,838
27	5 January 1957	10th	Bradford City	H	W	3–1	Bottom, Wilkinson, Fenton	10,492
28	12 January 1957	10th	Oldham Athletic	H	W	2–1	Bottom (2)	9,166
29	19 January 1957	10th	Mansfield Town	A	L	1–4	Wragg	6,941
30	26 January 1957	10th	Bradford City	A	W	2–0	Hughes, Fenton	13,281
31	2 February 1957	9th	Southport	H	W	9–1	Bottom (4, 1 pen.), Wilkinson (2), Brown, Wragg, Fenton	8,801
32	9 February 1957	9th	Chesterfield	A	W	4–3	Bottom (2), Hill, Fenton	16,610
33	16 February 1957	8th	Hull City	A	D	1–1	Wragg	15,697
34	23 February 1957	6th	Barrow	H	W	1–0	Fenton	8,004
35	2 March 1957	9th	Scunthorpe & Lindsey United	A	L	1–2	Fenton	7,848
36	9 March 1957	9th	Bradford Park Avenue	H	L	1–2	Bottom	8,857
37	16 March 1957	8th	Gateshead	A	W	2–0	Brown, Bottom pen.	4,934
38	23 March 1957	7th	Wrexham	H	W	1–0	Bottom	8,374
39	30 March 1957	10th	Derby County	A	L	0–1		21,164
40	6 April 1957	8th	Crewe Alexandra	H	W	2–1	Bottom, Wilkinson	7,271
41	13 April 1957	5th	Darlington	A	W	4–2	Hill (2), Wilkinson, Fenton	4,543
42	19 April 1957	6th	Stockport County	H	D	0–0		11,681
43	20 April 1957	5th	Rochdale	H	W	4–0	Wilkinson (3), Wragg	7,203
44	22 April 1957	8th	Stockport County	A	L	0–3		7,193
45	27 April 1957	9th	Rochdale	A	L	0–1		4,215
46	29 April 1957	6th	Derby County	H	D	1–1	Fenton	9,413

=== League table (part) ===
Final Football League Third Division North table (part)
Pos	Club	Pld	W	D	L	F	A	GA	Pts
5th	Stockport County	46	23	8	15	91	75	1.21	54
6th	Chesterfield	46	22	9	15	96	79	1.22	53
7th	York City	46	21	10	15	75	61	1.23	52
8th	Hull City	46	21	10	15	84	69	1.22	52
9th	Bradford City	46	22	8	16	78	68	1.15	52
Key	Pos = League position; Pld = Matches played; W = Matches won; D = Matches drawn; L = Matches lost; F = Goals for; A = Goals against; GA = Goal average; Pts = Points								
Source									

=== FA Cup ===
FA Cup match details
Round	Date	Opponents	Venue	Result	Score F–A	Scorers	Attendance
First round	17 November 1956	Southport	A	D	0–0		5,560
First round replay	21 November 1956	Southport	H	W	2–1	Wragg, Wilkinson	8,409
Second round	8 December 1956	Hull City	A	L	1–2	Bottom	24,155

== Appearances and goals ==
Players with names struck through and marked † left the club during the playing season.
Key to positions: GK – Goalkeeper; FB – Full back; HB – Half back; FW – Forward

Players having played at least one first-team match
Pos.	Nat.	Name	League		FA Cup		Total	
Pos.	Nat.	Name	Apps	Goals	Apps	Goals	Apps	Goals
GK	ENG	Tommy Forgan	46	0	3	0	49	0
FB	ENG	George Howe	45	0	2	0	47	0
FB	ENG	Ernie Phillips	36	0	1	0	37	0
FB	ENG	Dick Steel	1	0	0	0	1	0
FB	ENG	Ernie Wardle	10	0	3	0	13	0
HB	ENG	Gordon Brown	43	3	3	0	46	3
HB	SCO	Jim Cairney	32	0	3	0	35	0
HB	ENG	Ron Mollatt	36	0	0	0	36	0
HB	ENG	Alan Stewart	20	0	3	0	23	0
HB	ENG	Terry Stoddart	3	0	0	0	3	0
FW	ENG	Arthur Bottom	37	21	3	1	40	22
FW	ENG	Clive Colbridge	11	2	2	0	13	2
FW	ENG	Billy Fenton	37	14	1	0	38	14
FW	ENG	Billy Hill	13	3	0	0	13	3
FW	ENG	Albert Hobson	12	0	1	0	13	0
FW	SCO	Billy Hughes	24	4	2	0	26	4
FW	ENG	Alan Monkhouse	12	1	0	0	12	1
FW	ENG	John Powell	3	0	0	0	3	0
FW	ENG	John Stewart	1	0	0	0	1	0
FW	ENG	Norman Wilkinson	38	17	3	1	41	18
FW	ENG	Peter Wragg	46	8	3	1	49	9

== See also ==
- List of York City F.C. seasons
