= William Hughes =

William, Will or Bill Hughes may refer to:

== Politics ==
- Billy Hughes (1862–1952), prime minister of Australia during WWI
- William Hughes, 1st Baron Dinorben (1767–1852), British industrialist, politician and benefactor
- William Hughes, Baron Hughes (1911–1999), Scottish Labour Party politician
- William Hughes (Brooklyn), assemblyman in the 117th New York State Legislature (1894)
- William Hughes (senator) (1872–1918), U.S. representative and senator from New Jersey
- William Hughes (Wisconsin politician) (1841–1899), member of the Wisconsin State Assembly
- William Bulkeley Hughes (1797–1882), Welsh politician
- William Clark Hughes (1868–1930), speaker of the Louisiana House of Representatives
- William Edgar Hughes (1840–1918), member of the Texas House of Representatives
- William H. Hughes (1864–1903), American businessman and politician from New York
- William Hughes Hughes (1792–1874), British politician
- William J. Hughes (1932–2019), U.S. representative from New Jersey and ambassador
- William M. Hughes, member of the Los Angeles City Council, California

== Religion ==
- William Hughes (bishop of St Asaph) (died 1600), Welsh Anglican bishop
- William Hughes (bishop of Covington) (1921–2013), American Roman Catholic bishop
- William Hughes (Methodist bishop) (1877–1940), American bishop of the Central jurisdiction

== Sports ==
- Bill Hughes (American football) (1915–1978), American football player
- Bill Hughes (cricketer) (1859–1934), New Zealand cricketer
- Bill Hughes (first baseman) (1860–1928), baseball player
- Bill Hughes (ice hockey) (born 1947), Canadian ice hockey goaltender
- Bill Hughes (pitcher) (1896–1963), American baseball player in 1921
- Will Hughes (born 1995), English footballer for Derby County, Watford and Crystal Palace
- William Hughes (boxer and actor) (1998–2018), Welsh boxer and child actor
- William Hughes (1910s footballer) (1889–1955), English footballer for Halifax Town and Bradford City
- Billy Hughes (footballer, born 1865) (William Hughes, 1865–1919), English footballer for Liverpool
- Billy Hughes (footballer, born 1918) (William Marshall Hughes, 1918–1981), Birmingham, Chelsea and Wales international footballer
- Billy Hughes (footballer, born 1920) (William Henry Hughes, 1920–1995), Welsh footballer with Hartlepool United
- Billy Hughes (footballer, born March 1929) (William Hughes, 1929–2003), Scottish footballer with York City
- Billy Hughes (footballer, born May 1929) (William Hughes, 1929–2005), Northern Irish international footballer
- Billy Hughes (footballer, born 1948) (William Hughes, 1948–2019), Scottish footballer with Sunderland
- William L. Hughes (1895–1957), American college football player and coach
- Willie Hughes (footballer) (1909–1996), Scottish footballer for Celtic and Clyde

== Other ==
- Bill Hughes (musician) (1930–2018), American jazz musician
- Bill Hughes (police officer) (born 1950), Director General of Britain's Serious Organised Crime Agency
- William Hughes (As the World Turns), a fictional character on the American soap opera As the World Turns
- William Hughes (geographer) (1818–1876), British mapmaker, professor of geography and author
- William Hughes (professor of literature), British professor of Gothic studies, and author/editor of several books on Bram Stoker and the Gothic
- William Hughes (writer) (1803–1861), British writer on law and angling
- W. A. Hughes (William Alexander Hughes, 1816–1892), town clerk of Adelaide, South Australia
- William C. Hughes, lawyer in Oklahoma
- Willie Hughes (16th century), possible dedicatee of Shakespeare's sonnets

== See also ==
- Billy Hughes (disambiguation)
- William Hughes-Hughes (1817–1902), English barrister and founding member of the Philatelic Society, London.
- Billie Hughes (1948–1998), American songwriter, musician, and record producer
- Hughes (surname)
