= Billy Hughes (disambiguation) =

Billy Hughes (1862–1952) was the 7th Prime Minister of Australia.

Billy Hughes may also refer to:

- Billy Hughes (actor) (1948–2005), American actor
- Billy Hughes (Canadian football) (1888–1955), Canadian football and ice hockey coach and player
- Billy Hughes (educationist) (1914–1995), British Labour Party politician and educationist
- Billy Hughes (footballer, born 1865) (1865–1919), Welsh international
- Billy Hughes (footballer, born 1918) (1918–1981), Birmingham, Chelsea and Wales international footballer
- Billy Hughes (footballer, born 1920) (1920–1995), Welsh footballer with Hartlepool United
- Billy Hughes (footballer, born March 1929) (1929–2003), Scottish footballer with York City
- Billy Hughes (footballer, born May 1929) (1929–2005), Northern Irish international footballer
- Billy Hughes (footballer, born 1948) (1948–2019), Scottish footballer with Sunderland
- Billy Hughes (footballer, born 1960), English footballer with Gillingham
- Billy Hughes (musician) (1908–1995), Western Swing musician and songwriter

== See also ==
- Billie Hughes (1948–1998), American singer and songwriter
- William Hughes (disambiguation)
- Hughes (surname)
