= Mike McCartney (footballer) =

Scottish footballer

Personal information
- Full name: Michael McCartney
- Date of birth: 28 September 1954
- Place of birth: Musselburgh, Scotland
- Date of death: 2 January 2018 (aged 63)
- Height: 5 ft 9 in (1.75 m)
- Position: Full-back

Senior career*
Years	Team	Apps	(Gls)
1970–1973	West Bromwich Albion	0	(0)
1973–1980	Carlisle United	156	(17)
1980–1981	Southampton	22	(1)
1981–1983	Plymouth Argyle	49	(5)
1983–1987	Carlisle United	131	(7)
1988–1989	Gretna		
Total		358	(30)

Managerial career
- 1988–2000: Gretna
- * Club domestic league appearances and goals

Michael McCartney (28 September 1954 – 2 January 2018) was a Scottish footballer who played as a full-back in the 1970s and 1980s. He spent most of his career with Carlisle United, for whom he made nearly 300 League appearances in two spells, between which he played for Southampton and Plymouth Argyle. He subsequently had 11 1/2 years as manager of Scottish club Gretna.

== Playing career ==
McCartney was born in Musselburgh and grew up as a supporter of Edinburgh club Heart of Midlothian. Having played international football for the Scottish Schoolboys, he turned down the opportunity to join Hearts as a trainee and instead moved to England, joining West Bromwich Albion, for whom he signed on as an apprentice in July 1970. Although he signed a professional contract in December 1971, he failed to break into the first team.

In May 1973, he joined his former manager at Albion, Alan Ashman, signing for Second Division Carlisle United. At the end of McCartney's first season at Brunton Park, Carlisle finished in third place in the Second Division and were promoted to the First Division for the first time in the club's history. The Cumbrian club only managed one season in the top division, in which they finished in last place following which Carlisle fell down through the divisions and by 1977 they were in the Third Division.

In July 1980, McCartney (now considered "one of the best left-backs in the lower divisions") was given the chance to return to the First Division by Southampton's manager Lawrie McMenemy who signed him for £50,000. He was one of two players who made his debut for the Saints in a 2–0 victory against Manchester City on 16 August 1980, the other being England international Kevin Keegan, whose arrival at The Dell overshadowed that of McCartney. McCartney failed to settle back in the First Division and, after a run of 15 consecutive matches, including a 7–1 defeat at Watford in the League Cup, he lost his place at left-back to Nick Holmes. After a total of 24 appearances, with one goal, McCartney returned to the Third Division with Plymouth Argyle in August 1981, for the same fee that Southampton had paid to Carlisle a year earlier.

McCartney made his debut at Home Park on 15 August 1981 in a Football League Group Cup match against AFC Bournemouth which ended goalless. Described as a "tough-tackling full-back", McCartney made a total of 62 appearances, scoring six goals, for Argyle before returning to Carlisle just before the end of the 1982–83 season in an exchange deal with Gordon Staniforth.

He remained at Carlisle for five years during which time they were relegated twice and in 1987–88 they finished second from bottom of the Fourth Division. In February 1986, McCartney suffered an ankle injury in a match at Sunderland which brought his Football League career to an end, aged 33.

== Management career ==
In the summer of 1988, McCartney returned across the border to Scotland joining Gretna of the Northern League Division One, initially as a player-manager, becoming full-time manager the following year. In his first season as manager, Gretna finished as runners-up in the Northern League, followed by the championship in the next two years. In 1991–92, Gretna became the first Scottish club to reach the first round proper of the FA Cup for 105 years, where they were eliminated by Rochdale after a replay. They reached the first round again in 1993–94, going out 2–3 to Bolton Wanderers of the First Division.

Following their success in the Northern League, Gretna applied to join the Scottish League and McCartney himself worked on the required ground improvements. Following the failure of the application, and against McCartney's wishes, Gretna joined the Northern Premier League for the 1992–93 season, where they finished in a respectable sixth place. McCartney was concerned that the additional costs of travelling to clubs across northern England and North Wales would cause the club financial difficulties. Gradually the club's performances deteriorated with finishes in the lower half of the league and the club were forced to the edge of insolvency, leading to McCartney being dismissed in January 2000.

== Later life ==
Gretna was later acquired by Brooks Mileson who invested heavily in the club. In 2006, they reached the Scottish Cup Final, where they were defeated on penalties by McCartney's boyhood heroes, Hearts. Although Gretna defender Derek Townsley supplied him with a complimentary ticket to the Cup Final, McCartney supported Gretna's opponents.

McCartney watched Hearts regularly, travelling from his home in Carlisle, where he worked in the building trade and as a van driver. He died in January 2018, aged 63, following an illness.

== Honours ==
=== As manager ===
Gretna

- Northern League Division One
  - Champions: 1990–91, 1991–92
  - Runners-up: 1989–90

== Bibliography ==
- Chalk, Gary; Holley, Duncan; Bull, David (2013). All the Saints – A Complete Players' Who's Who of Southampton FC. Hagiology Publishing. ISBN 978-0-9926864-0-6.
- Collett, Mike (2003). The Complete Record of the FA Cup. Sports Books. ISBN 1-899807-19-5.
- Holley, Duncan; Chalk, Gary (1992). The Alphabet of the Saints. ACL & Polar Publishing. ISBN 0-9514862-3-3.
- Holley, Duncan; Chalk, Gary (2003). In That Number – A Post-war Chronicle of Southampton FC. Hagiology Publishing. ISBN 0-9534474-3-X.
