= Absolom Gant =

American politician (1832–1897)

Absolom Gant Jr. (October 30, 1832 – May 2, 1897) was an American politician from Texas.

Gant's parents, Absolom Sr. and Mary, lived in Martin, Tennessee, at the time of his birth on October 30, 1832. The younger Gant attended schools in his home state, and in 1853, served as justice of the peace in Wayne County. Gant completed a degree from Cumberland University in 1859, and moved to Tarrant County, Texas to become a schoolteacher.

Gant served in the Confederate States Army during the American Civil War, as a third lieutenant in Company A of the Ninth Texas Cavalry Regiment. Following the Siege of Corinth, Gant was promoted to captain. Due to medical disability, Gant resigned his commission and returned home before the war ended. He then partnered with a physician from Weatherford, Texas, in the pharmaceutical trade. Over the years, Gant acquired property as a real estate dealer, and became the largest landowner in Parker County. Gant married Minerva Raines in Rusk County on December 18, 1867, and the family later moved to Graham, where Gant operated a salt mine. Following the resignation of William Edgar Hughes from the Texas House of Representatives on March 1, 1871, Gant was sworn in as a Democratic state representative based in Young County on October 31, 1871. Gant served until January 14, 1873, and died on May 2, 1897.
