= York City F.C. Clubman of the Year =

Annual award

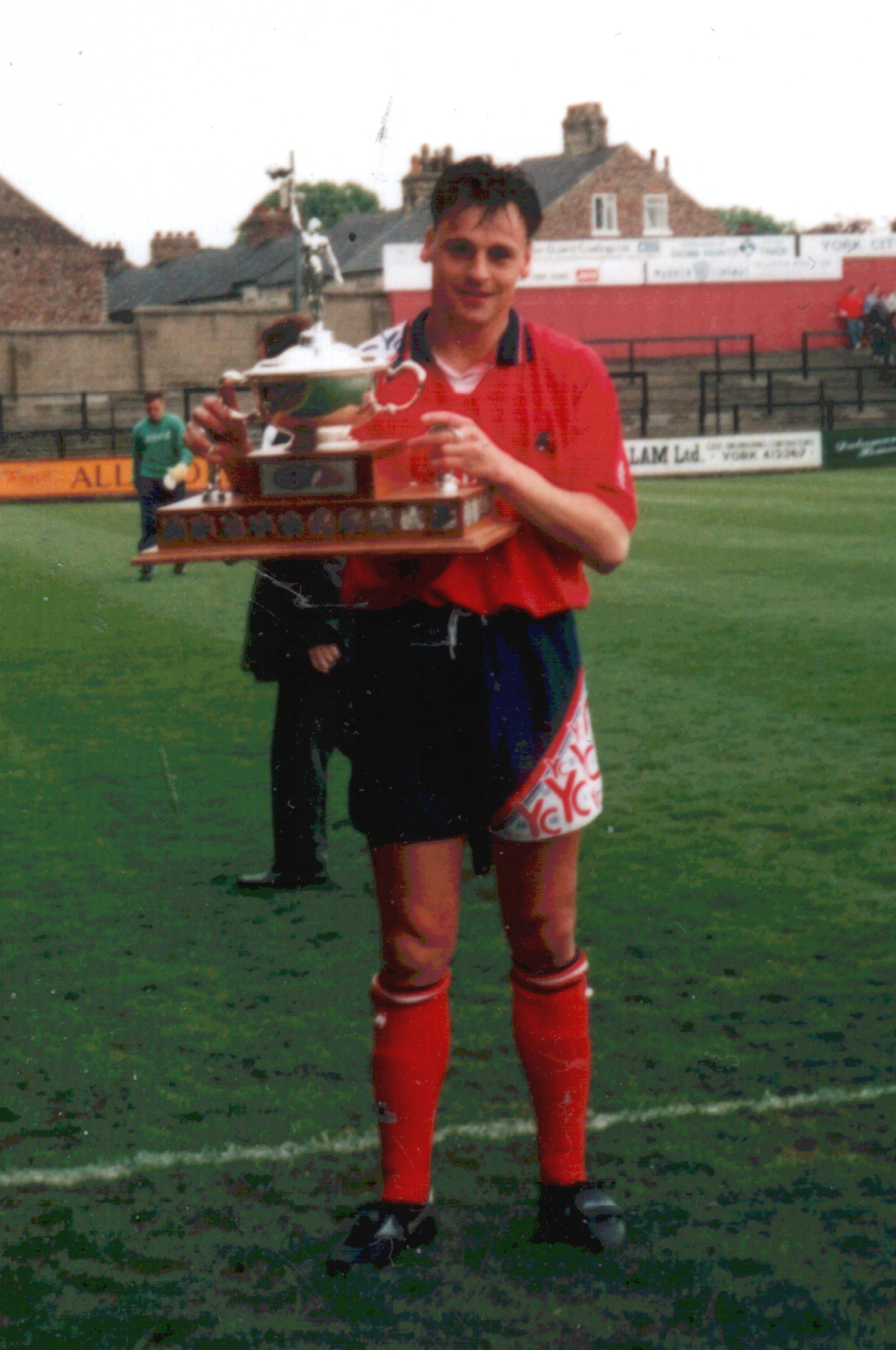
Paul Barnes lifting the Billy Fenton Memorial Trophy, which he won in the 1993–94 season

York City Football Club is a professional association football club based in York, North Yorkshire, England. Founded in 1922, the club was elected to play in the Midland League, and competed in this league for seven seasons before being elected to the Football League as members of the Third Division North in 1929. York reached the second tier of English football with promotion to the Second Division in 1974, but were relegated two years later. York became the first team to reach 100 points in a Football League season after winning the 1983–84 Fourth Division championship with 101 points, which was the club's first league title. The club was relegated to the Football Conference following the 2003–04 season, but returned to the Football League with victory in the 2012 Conference Premier play-off final. They came back to the EFL in the 2025-26 National League with a 1-1 draw against title rivals Rochdale A.F.C.

The York City Clubman of the Year award is voted for annually by the club's supporters to name a player who throughout the season has met the three criteria of sportsmanship, effort on the field of play and ability. Previously fans voted by either handing a voting form to the club or by e-mailing the club and can now vote via an online poll. As a mark of respect, the trophy is named the Billy Fenton Memorial Trophy, after player Billy Fenton, who died suddenly in 1973. The award is presented before the final home match of the season, for many years by Fenton's widow, Margot Fenton. However, the presentation of the award took place at an awards night in 2011, while the following year it was presented after the final home game of the season. From 2014 to 2015, an awards night was held at York Racecourse to present the award. In 2016, the award was presented before the final home match of the season.

Since the inaugural award was made to Phil Burrows in 1974, 38 different players have won the award. Eight of these players have won the award for at least a second time, the most recent being Sean Newton. Newton and Daniel Parslow are the only players to have received the award on three occasions. Gordon Staniforth was the first to win the trophy in consecutive seasons, a feat since emulated by John MacPhail, Barry Jones and Alan Fettis. Three winners of the award have represented their country at senior international level, of whom Jon McCarthy and Alan Fettis went on to become Clubman of the Year for a second time. Chris Brass, the winner of the 2003 award, went on to manage the club from 2003 to 2004. The 2025-26 recipient of the award was Ollie Pearce.

== Key ==
- ‡ denotes a divisional change due to promotion or relegation.
- † denotes a player registered with York City in the 2025–26 season.
- Player (X) denotes the number of times a player has won the award.

== Winners ==
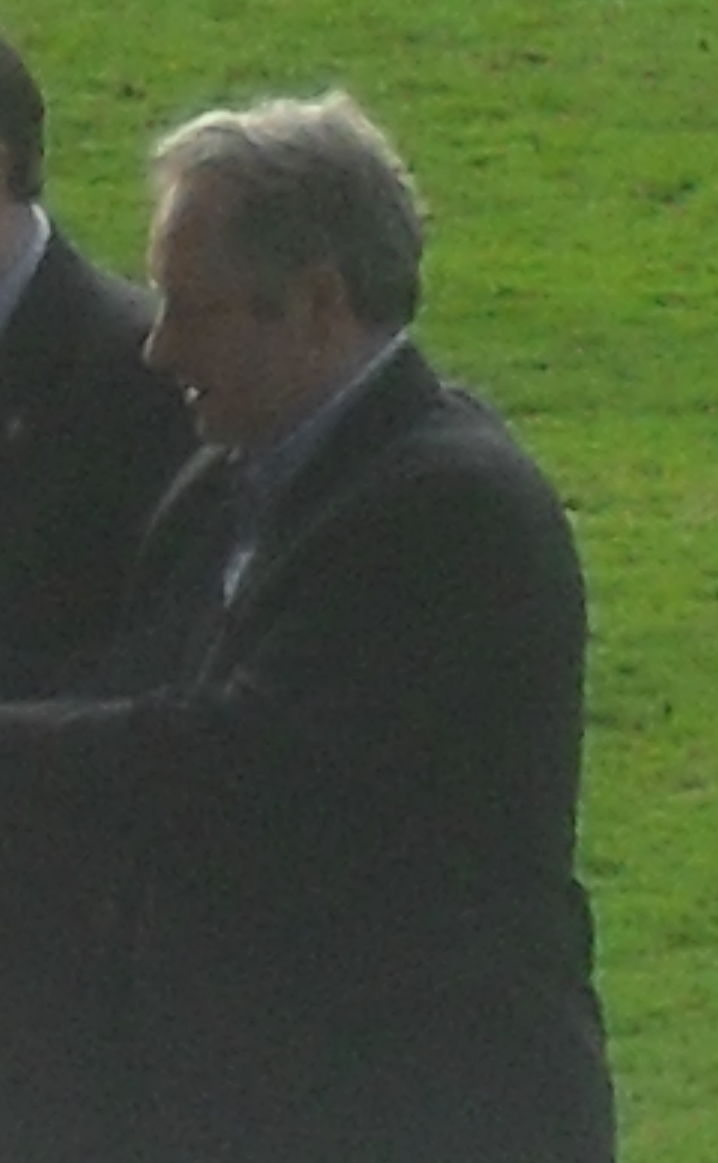
Gordon Staniforth was the first player to win the award twice, receiving it in the 1977–78 and 1978–79 seasons.

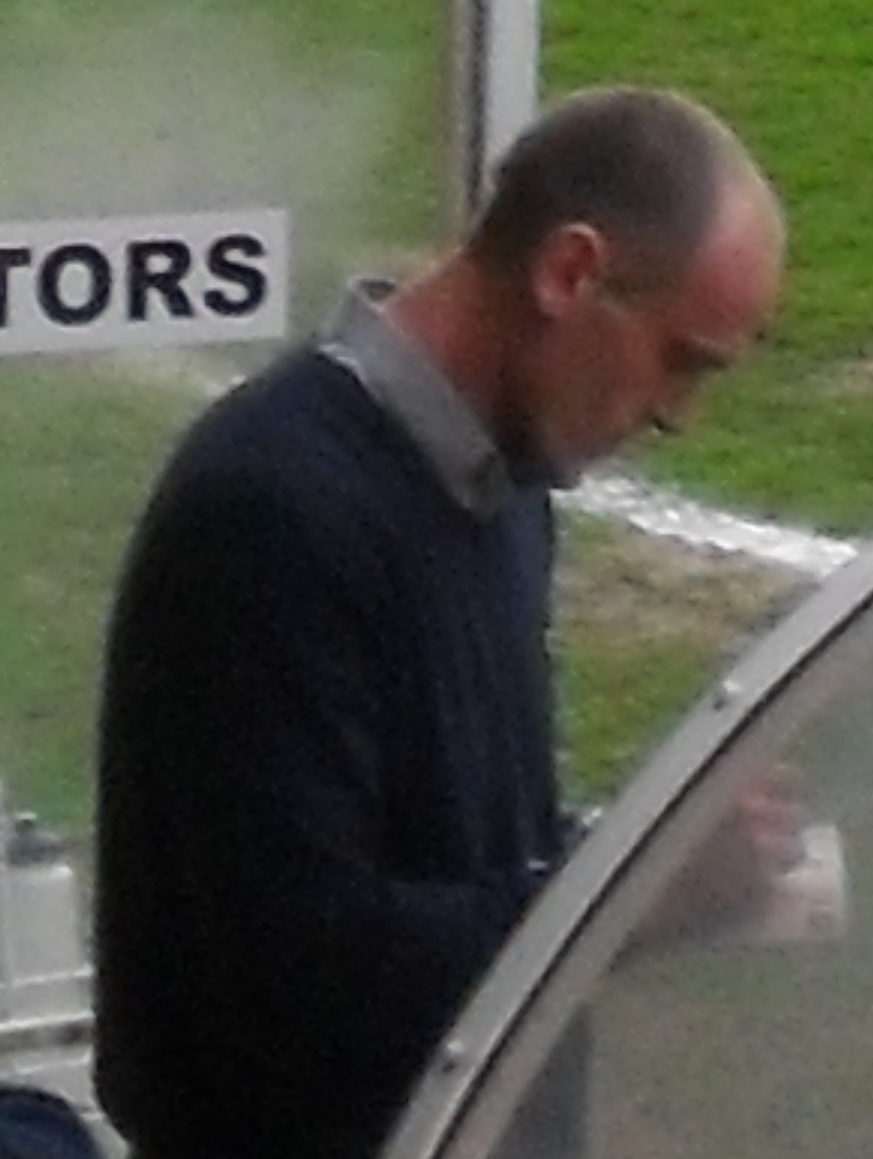
Steve Tutill made 366 appearances in 12 seasons with York.

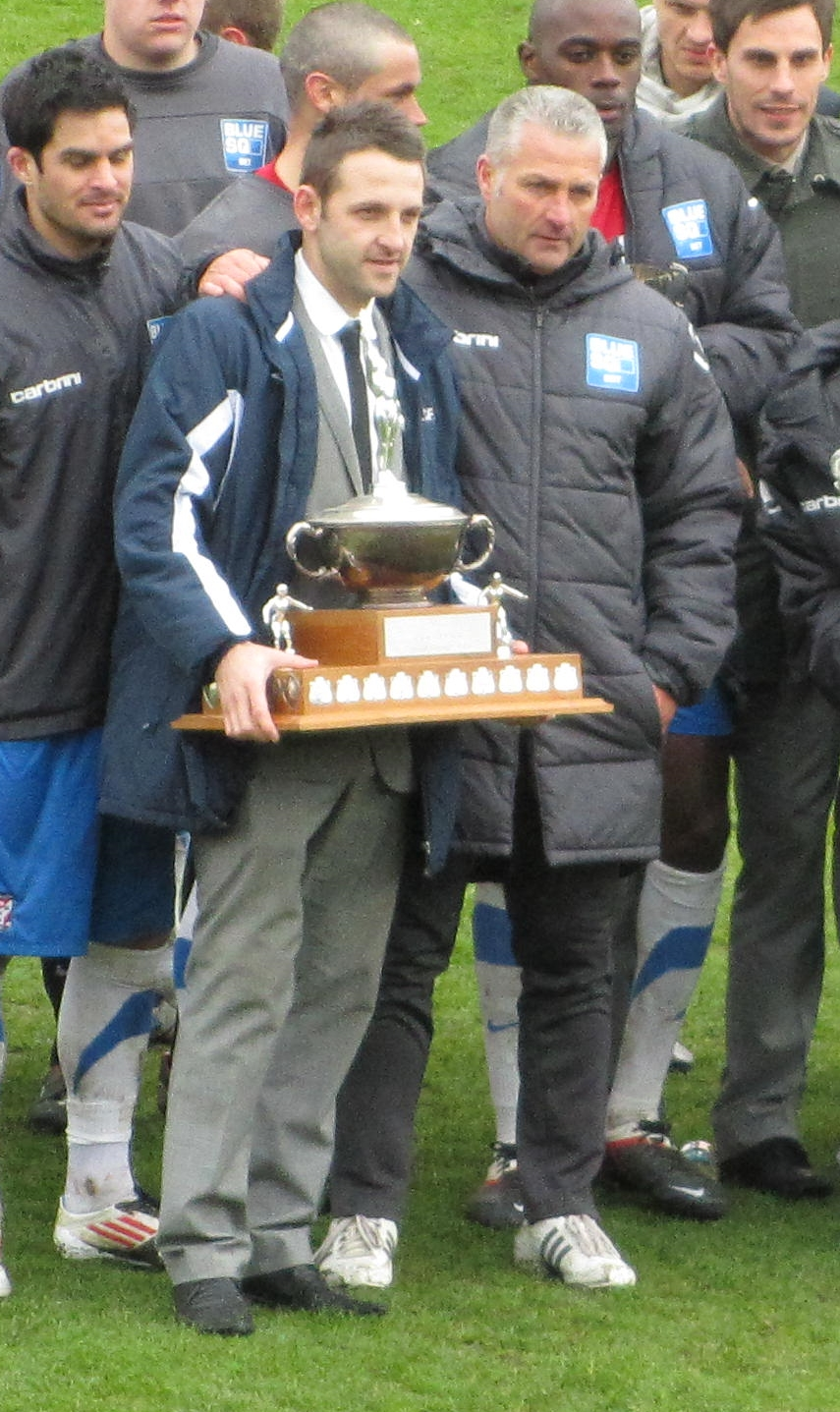
Scott Kerr (left) won the award for 2011–12, a season which culminated in York's return to the Football League.

As of the end of the 2025–26 season

Season	Level (Note: The official level of competition in the structure of the English football league system.)	Name	Position (Note: For a detailed description of playing positions, see Association football positions.)	Nationality	Apps (Note: Appearances and goals from the season the player won the award. Includes appearances and goals in the Football League (including play-offs), Football Conference/National League (including play-offs), FA Cup, Football League Cup, Associate Members Cup/Football League Trophy, FA Trophy and Conference League Cup. Sources: 1973–74 to 2007–08, 2008–09, 2009–10, 2010–11, 2011–12, 2012–13 to 2015–16, 2016–17, 2017–18, and 2018–19.)	Goals	Notes
1973–74	3	Phil Burrows	Defender	England	54	3	(Note: The first winner of the award in 1974.)
1974–75	2 ‡	Chris Topping	Defender	England	45	2	
1975–76	2	Micky Cave	Midfielder	England	38	8	
1976–77	3 ‡	Brian Pollard	Midfielder	England	52	13	
1977–78	4 ‡	Gordon Staniforth	Forward	England	50	13	
1978–79	4	Gordon Staniforth (2)	Forward	England	52	19	(Note: Won the award on two occasions.)
1979–80	4	Ian McDonald	Midfielder	England	51	9	
1980–81	4	Eddie Blackburn	Goalkeeper	England	51	0	
1981–82	4	Keith Walwyn	Forward	Saint Kitts and Nevis	49	25	
1982–83	4	Derek Hood	Midfielder	England	52	9	(Note: Hood played as a defender and a midfielder during his eight-year stay with York, but is listed as a midfielder as this is the position he played most matches this season.)
1983–84	4	John MacPhail	Defender	Scotland	52	10	
1984–85	3 ‡	John MacPhail (2)	Defender	Scotland	55	9	
1985–86	3	Simon Mills	Midfielder	England	46	1	
1986–87	3	Keith Walwyn (2)	Forward	Saint Kitts and Nevis	52	25	
1987–88	3	Dale Banton	Forward	England	43	18	
1988–89	4 ‡	Ian Helliwell	Forward	England	47	11	
1989–90	4	Chris Marples	Goalkeeper	England	53	0	
1990–91	4	Steve Tutill	Defender	England	50	0	
1991–92	4	Jon McCarthy	Midfielder	Northern Ireland	49	9	
1992–93	4	Paul Stancliffe	Defender	England	48	1	
1993–94	3 ‡	Paul Barnes	Forward	England	49	25	
1994–95	3	Jon McCarthy (2)	Midfielder	Northern Ireland	50	10	
1995–96	3	Andy McMillan	Defender	South Africa	57	1	
1996–97	3	Tony Barras	Defender	England	57	1	
1997–98	3	Steve Bushell	Midfielder	England	47	5	
1998–99	3	Barry Jones	Defender	England	51	2	
1999–2000	4 ‡	Barry Jones (2)	Defender	England	40	1	
2000–01	4	Alan Fettis	Goalkeeper	Northern Ireland	51	0	
2001–02	4	Alan Fettis (2)	Goalkeeper	Northern Ireland	52	0	
2002–03	4	Chris Brass	Defender	England	44	1	
2003–04	4	Darren Dunning	Midfielder	England	45	4	
2004–05	5 ‡	Dave Merris	Defender	England	44	2	
2005–06	5	Clayton Donaldson	Forward	England	45	18	
2006–07	5	Neal Bishop	Midfielder	England	49	3	
2007–08	5	David McGurk	Defender	England	56	1	
2008–09	5	Daniel Parslow	Defender	Wales	57	0	
2009–10	5	Michael Ingham	Goalkeeper	Northern Ireland	55	0	
2010–11	5	Daniel Parslow (2)	Defender	Wales	47	1	
2011–12	5	Scott Kerr	Midfielder	England	42	1	
2012–13	4 ‡	Daniel Parslow (3)	Defender	Wales	50	1	(Note: Won the award on three occasions.)
2013–14	4	Lanre Oyebanjo	Defender	Republic of Ireland	46	0	
2014–15	4	Keith Lowe	Defender	England	49	6	
2015–16	4	Dave Winfield	Defender	England	40	2	
2016–17	5 ‡	Sean Newton	Defender	England	35	3	
2017–18	6 ‡	Jon Parkin	Forward	England	32	25	
2018–19	6	Sean Newton (2)	Defender	England	37	6	
2019–20	6	Sean Newton (3)	Defender	England	39	5	
2020–21	6	The Fans	-	-	0	0	
2021–22	6	Peter Jameson	Goalkeeper	England	56	0	
2022–23	5 ‡	Olly Dyson	Midfielder	England	42	4	
2023-24	5	Ryan Fallowfield †	Defender	England	41	4	
2024-25	5	Joe Felix †	Defender	England	49	3	
2025-26	5	Ollie Pearce †	Forward	England	49	35	

== Wins by playing position ==
Position	Players	Wins
Goalkeeper	5	6
Defender	18	24
Midfielder	11	12
Forward	8	10

== Wins by nationality ==
Nationality	Players	Wins
England	34	38
Northern Ireland	3	5
Wales	1	3
Saint Kitts and Nevis	1	2
Scotland	1	2
Republic of Ireland	1	1
South Africa	1	1
