= Eddie Blackburn =

English footballer (1957–2018)

Personal information
- Full name: Edwin Huitson Blackburn
- Date of birth: 18 April 1957
- Place of birth: Houghton-le-Spring, England
- Date of death: 20 April 2018 (aged 61)
- Place of death: York, North Yorkshire, England
- Height: 5 ft 9 in (1.75 m)
- Position: Goalkeeper

Youth career
- 1973–1974: Hull City

Senior career*
Years	Team	Apps	(Gls)
1974–1980	Hull City	68	(0)
1980–1983	York City	76	(0)
1982–1983	→ Hartlepool United (loan)	0	(0)
1983–1987	Hartlepool United	161	(0)
1987	→ Halmstads BK (loan)	7	(0)
Total		312	(0)
- * Club domestic league appearances and goals

Edwin Huitson Blackburn (18 April 1957 – 20 April 2018) was an English footballer who played as a goalkeeper. He played in the Football League for Hull City, York City and Hartlepool United, before he finished his career in the Swedish Allsvenskan with Halmstads BK.

== Career ==
Born in Houghton-le-Spring, County Durham, Blackburn started his career with Hull City as an apprentice in February 1973 before signing a professional contract in September 1974. He made 75 appearances for Hull in all competitions before becoming Barry Lyons' first signing for York City for a fee of £5,750 in April 1980. He finished his first season at the club being named Clubman of the Year as York finished bottom of the Fourth Division. After York signed Roger Jones in the summer of 1982 he joined Hartlepool United on loan in December, before joining the club permanently in January 1983. He finished his career in Sweden on loan to Halmstads BK after that club's first-choice goalkeeper injured his knee.

== Career statistics ==
Appearances and goals by club, season and competition
Club	Season	League^{[A]}		FA Cup		League Cup		Other^{[B]}		Total	
Club	Season	Apps	Goals	Apps	Goals	Apps	Goals	Apps	Goals	Apps	Goals
Hull City	1974–75	2	0	0	0	0	0	0	0	2	0
Hull City	1975–76	0	0	0	0	0	0	0	0	0	0
Hull City	1976–77	0	0	0	0	0	0	0	0	0	0
Hull City	1977–78	19	0	1	0	0	0	0	0	20	0
Hull City	1978–79	18	0	2	0	0	0	0	0	20	0
Hull City	1979–80	29	0	2	0	2	0	0	0	33	0
Hull City	Total	68	0	5	0	2	0	0	0	75	0
York City	1979–80	0	0	0	0	0	0	0	0	0	0
York City	1980–81	45	0	2	0	4	0	0	0	51	0
York City	1981–82	31	0	3	0	2	0	0	0	36	0
York City	1982–83	0	0	0	0	0	0	0	0	0	0
York City	Total	76	0	5	0	6	0	0	0	87	0
Hartlepool United (loan)	1982–83	0	0	0	0	0	0	0	0	0	0
Hartlepool United	1982–83	20	0	0	0	0	0	0	0	20	0
Hartlepool United	1983–84	41	0	0	0	2	0	1	0	44	0
Hartlepool United	1984–85	9	0	0	0	0	0	1	0	10	0
Hartlepool United	1985–86	46	0	2	0	2	0	1	0	51	0
Hartlepool United	1986–87	45	0	1	0	2	0	2	0	50	0
Hartlepool United	Total	161	0	3	0	6	0	5	0	175	0
Halmstads BK (loan)	1987	7	0	0	0	0	0	0	0	7	0
Career totals		312	0	13	0	14	0	5	0	344	0

== Footnotes ==
A. The "League" column constitutes appearances and goals (including those as a substitute) in the Football League and Allsvenskan.
B. The "Other" column constitutes appearances and goals (including those as a substitute) in the Football League Trophy.
