= Dick Steel =

English footballer

Personal information
- Full name: Richard Steel
- Date of birth: 13 March 1930
- Place of birth: Sedgefield, County Durham, England
- Date of death: August 1991 (aged 61)
- Place of death: Tickenham, Bristo, Englandl
- Height: 5 ft 11 in (1.80 m)
- Position: Full-back

Senior career*
Years	Team	Apps	(Gls)
- Ferryhill Athletic
1953–1956	Bristol City	3	(0)
1956–1958	York City	3	(0)
- Merthyr Tydfil
1963–????	Chippenham Town		
Total		6+	(0+)
- * Club domestic league appearances and goals

Richard Steel (13 March 1930 – August 1991) was an English professional footballer who played as a full-back in the Football League for Bristol City and York City, and in non-League football for Ferryhill Athletic, Merthyr Tydfil and Chippenham Town.
