= 2004–05 Conference Cup =

Tournament details
- Country: England; Wales

Final positions
- Champions: Woking (1st title)
- Runners-up: Stalybridge Celtic

The 2004–05 Conference Cup, known as the Carthium Cup and later the GLS Cup for sponsorship reasons, was a football tournament for clubs competing in that season's Football Conference. It was the first time the Conference League Cup had been held since the 2000–01 season. The competition was won by Woking, who defeated Stalybridge Celtic in the final.

== Results ==
=== Preliminary round ===
North : Ashton United 6, Altrincham 2; Moor Green 1, Redditch United 2

South : Redbridge 0, Grays Athletic 3; Basingstoke Town 2, Lewes 1

=== Round 1 ===
North : Droylsden 1, Ashton United 0; Worcester City 2, Stafford Rangers 1; Hucknall Town 1, Gainsborough Trinity 4; Nuneaton Borough 4, Redditch United 3; Barrow 4, Southport 1; Kettering Town 4, Hinckley United 2; Alfreton Town 0, Worksop Town 1; Harrogate Town 0, Bradford Park Avenue 1; Stalybridge Celtic 4, Lancaster City 2

South : Bishop's Stortford 5, Cambridge City 0; Bognor Regis Town 2, Eastbourne Borough 1; Hayes 1, Maidenhead United 2; Hornchurch 1, Thurrock 2; St Albans City 2, Grays Athletic 6; Welling United 0, Margate 2; Dorchester Town 2, Weston-super-Mare 1; Sutton United 3, Carshalton Athletic 2; Weymouth 0, Newport County 2; Havant & Waterlooville 2, Basingstoke Town 1

=== Round 2 ===
North Droylsden 1, Worcester City 2 Kettering Town 4, Nuneaton Borough 2 Barrow 0, Runcorn FC Halton 1 Worksop Town 4, Gainsborough Trinity 1 Stalybridge Celtic 1, Bradford Park Avenue 0

South Thurrock 1, Margate 2 Dorchester Town 0, Newport County 1 Grays Athletic H, Bishops Stortford W Maidenhead United 2, Sutton United 4 Havant & Waterlooville 5, Bognor Regis Town 1

=== Round 3 ===
North Burton Albion 2, Hereford United 4; Kettering Town 1, Worksop Town 2; Tamworth 3, Worcester City 1; Morecambe 2, Scarborough 1; Northwich Victoria 1, Leigh RMI 0; Runcorn FC Halton 2, Carlisle United 6; Accrington Stanley 2, York City 1; Stalybridge Celtic 7, Halifax Town 3

South Barnet 0, Grays Athletic 3; Forest Green Rovers 4, Newport County 3 (a.e.t); Margate 2, Dagenham & Redbridge 1; Gravesend & Northfleet 0 Stevenage Borough 1; Sutton United 0 Woking 3; Havant & Waterlooville 2 Farnborough Town 0; Aldershot Town 1 Exeter City 0; Canvey Island 0, Crawley Town 0 (5-4 Crawley on pens)

=== Round 4 ===
North Accrington Stanley 6, Tamworth 0 Morecambe 1, Carlisle United 1 (3-1 Morecambe on pens) Hereford United 0, Northwich Victoria 1 Worksop Town 0, Stalybridge Celtic 1

South Stevenage Borough 1, Grays Athletic 1 (Stevenage 3–1 on pens) Forest Green Rovers 5, Aldershot Town 1 Woking 2, Havant & Waterlooville 2 (Woking 4–3 on pens) Crawley Town 2, Margate 1

=== Round 5 ===
North Accrington Stanley 4, Northwich Victoria 3 Morecambe 1, Stalybridge Celtic 2

South Stevenage Borough 2, Crawley Town 1 Woking 3, Forest Green Rovers 1

=== Semi-finals ===
North Stalybridge Celtic 0, Accrington Stanley 0 (5-4 Stalybridge on pens)

South Woking 4, Stevenage Borough 2

=== Final ===
Stalybridge Celtic 0, Woking 1 (Stalybridge won toss for choice of ground)
