= Phil Burrows (footballer) =

English footballer

Personal information
- Full name: Philip Arthur Burrows
- Date of birth: 8 April 1946 (age 80)
- Place of birth: Stockport, England
- Position: Defender

Youth career
- ?–1964: Manchester City

Senior career*
Years	Team	Apps	(Gls)
1964–1966	Manchester City	0	(0)
1966–1974	York City	337	(14)
1974–1976	Plymouth Argyle	81	(2)
1976–1980	Hereford United	110	(0)
1977	→ Gillingham (loan)	5	(0)
1980–?	Witton Albion	?	(?)
	Mossley	?	(?)
- * Club domestic league appearances and goals

Philip Arthur Burrows (born 8 April 1946) is an English former footballer who played as a defender.

== Career ==
Born in Stockport, Greater Manchester, Burrows began his career as a junior with Manchester City, turning professional in July 1964. He failed to make the first team with City and joined York City in June 1966. He was an ever-present in the York side for his first four seasons with the club and went on to make nearly 400 first team appearances as City rose from the Fourth to the Second flight of English football.

In 1974 Burrows was the first winner of the York City Clubman of the Year Award, a trophy in memory of former York player Billy Fenton who had died the previous year. Burrows was sold to Plymouth Argyle for a fee of £16,000 in July 1974 and was a regular in the Plymouth side for the next two seasons, helping Plymouth to promotion from the Third Division.

Burrows moved to Hereford United in August 1976 and had a loan spell with Gillingham in October 1977. He remained with Hereford until 1980 when he left to join non-league Witton Albion. He was playing for Northern Premier League side Mossley in October 1981.

Phil's father and grandfather, both named Arthur, were also part-time professional footballers. His father was featured in the longest game ever in 1946 (Stockport v Doncaster) and his grandfather was in the Stockport squad for the 1921 Stockport v Leicester game which attracted just 13 spectators.
