= Terry Stoddart =

English footballer

Personal information
- Full name: Terence Stoddart
- Date of birth: 28 November 1931
- Place of birth: Newcastle upon Tyne, England
- Date of death: October 2014 (aged 82)
- Place of death: Newcastle upon Tyne, England
- Position: Wing half

Senior career*
Years	Team	Apps	(Gls)
1949–1954	Newcastle United	0	(0)
1954–1956	Darlington	8	(0)
1956–1957	York City	3	(0)
–	Poole Town		
- * Club domestic league appearances and goals

Terence Stoddart (28 November 1931 – October 2014) was an English footballer who played as a wing half in the Football League for Darlington and York City. He was also on the books of Newcastle United without playing for their first team.

Stoddart was born in Newcastle upon Tyne. He represented Northumberland at youth level, and began his club career in Newcastle United's nursery team. He played for the club's reserve team for several years, but never for the first team, and in May 1954 he moved on to Third Division North club Darlington. He played only infrequently over two seasons, then spent a season with divisional rivals York City, again playing rarely, before moving into non-league football with Poole Town.
