= Dave Merris =

English footballer

Personal information
- Full name: David Andrew Merris
- Date of birth: 13 October 1980 (age 46)
- Place of birth: Rotherham, England
- Height: 5 ft 7 in (1.70 m)
- Position: Defender

Team information
- Current team: Pickering Town

Youth career
- –1998: Rotherham United

Senior career*
Years	Team	Apps	(Gls)
1998–1999	Guiseley		
1999–2003	Harrogate Town	148	(11)
2003–2006	York City	109	(2)
2006–2008	Harrogate Town	74	(6)
2008–2012	Guiseley (Note: The Guiseley appearances and goals only cover the 2010–11 and 2011–12 seasons in the Conference North.)	82	(0)
2012–2014	Harrogate Town	80	(2)
2014–2016	Ossett Town		
2016–2020	Scarborough Athletic		
2020–2022	Pickering Town		
2022–	Guernsey	39	(1)
- * Club domestic league appearances and goals as of 16:17 7 November 2016 (UTC)

David Andrew Merris (born 13 October 1980) is an English semi-professional footballer who plays as a defender for Guernsey FC.

== Career ==
Born in Rotherham, South Yorkshire, Merris was a member of the youth system of his hometown club Rotherham United before joining Guiseley in 1998. He joined Harrogate Town in September 1999, with whom he won the Northern Premier League First Division title in the 2001–02 season. Merris signed for Third Division club York City on 6 August 2003 following a trial. He won York's Clubman of the Year award for the 2004–05 season. Merris signed a new deal with York at the end of the 2004–05 season. He was released by York at the end of the 2005–06 season and subsequently signed for former club Harrogate on 29 June 2006. On 20 March 2008, he joined Guiseley from Harrogate for an undisclosed fee. He was released by the club in May 2012 before signing for Harrogate for the third time on 31 May. Merris joined Northern Premier League Division One North club Ossett Town as a player-coach in June 2014. and was appointed player-assistant manager in November 2014

== Career statistics ==
As of match played 26 April 2014.

Appearances and goals by club, season and competition
Club	Season	League			FA Cup		League Cup		Other		Total	
Club	Season	Division	Apps	Goals	Apps	Goals	Apps	Goals	Apps	Goals	Apps	Goals
Harrogate Town	1999–2000	NPL First Division	32	1			—				32	1
Harrogate Town	2000–01	NPL First Division	39	2			—				39	2
Harrogate Town	2001–02	NPL First Division	37	4			—				37	4
Harrogate Town	2002–03	NPL Premier Division	40	4			—				40	4
Harrogate Town	Total		148	11			—				148	11
York City	2003–04	Third Division	44	0	1	0	1	1	1 (Note: Appearance in Football League Trophy)	0	47	1
York City	2004–05	Conference National	40	2	1	0	—		3 (Note: One appearance in Football League Trophy, one in FA Trophy, one in Conference Cup)	0	44	2
York City	2005–06	Conference National	25	0	2	0	—		0	0	27	0
York City	Total		109	2	4	0	1	1	4	0	118	3
Harrogate Town	2006–07	Conference North	42	3	3	0	—		3 (Note: Appearance(s) in FA Trophy)	0	48	3
Harrogate Town	2007–08	Conference North	32	3	4	0	—		2 (Note: One appearance in Conference League Cup, one in FA Trophy)	0	38	3
Harrogate Town	Total		74	6	7	0	—		5	0	86	6
Guiseley	2010–11	Conference North	40	0	5	0	—		9 (Note: Six appearances in FA Trophy, three in Conference North play-offs)	0	54	0
Guiseley	2011–12	Conference North	42	0	2	0	—		6 (Note: Four appearances in FA Trophy, two in Conference North play-offs)	0	50	0
Guiseley	Total		82	0	7	0	—		15	0	104	0
Harrogate Town	2012–13	Conference North	42	1	5	0	—		1	0	48	1
Harrogate Town	2013–14	Conference North	38	1	0	0	—		0	0	38	1
Harrogate Town	Total		80	2	5	0	—		1	0	86	2
Career total			493	21	23	0	1	1	25	0	542	22

== Honours ==
Harrogate Town

- Northern Premier League First Division: 2001–02

Individual

- York City Clubman of the Year: 2004–05
