= Darren Dunning =

English footballer

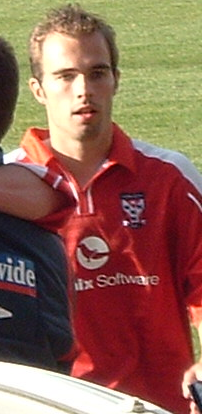
- Dunning playing for York City

Personal information
- Full name: Darren Dunning
- Date of birth: 8 January 1981 (age 45)
- Place of birth: Scarborough, England
- Height: 5 ft 7 in (1.70 m)
- Position: Midfielder

Youth career
- ?–1999: Blackburn Rovers

Senior career*
Years	Team	Apps	(Gls)
1999–2003	Blackburn Rovers	1	(0)
2000	→ Bristol City (loan)	9	(0)
2001–2002	→ Rochdale (loan)	5	(0)
2002	→ Blackpool (loan)	5	(0)
2002	→ Torquay United (loan)	7	(1)
2003	→ Macclesfield Town (loan)	17	(0)
2003–2006	York City	122	(7)
2006–2009	Harrogate Town		
2009–2010	Gainsborough Trinity		
- * Club domestic league appearances and goals

Darren Dunning (born 8 January 1981) is an English former professional footballer who played as a midfielder.

Having come through the youth academy at Blackburn Rovers he spent time on loan with Bristol City, Rochdale, Blackpool, Torquay United and Macclesfield Town. He notably spent three seasons with York City and later had spells with Harrogate Town and Gainsborough Trinity.

== Career ==
Born in Scarborough, North Yorkshire, Dunning grew up in the village of Welburn before attending Malton School. He began his career as a trainee with the Blackburn Rovers youth system, turning professional in February 1999. He joined Bristol City on loan in August 2000, making his league debut for the Robins on 12 August 2000, in a 2–0 win away to Wrexham. He played nine times for City before returning to Blackburn that October.

His Blackburn debut came on 31 October 2000, Dunning playing all of the 2–0 League Cup defeat away to West Ham United. He also played one FA Cup match and one league match for Blackburn before the end of the 2000–01 season.

He scored his first and only Blackburn goal in a 2–0 win over Oldham in the League Cup. He joined Rochdale on loan in November 2001 and moved to Blackpool on loan in March 2002, making just one first team appearance for Blackburn, in the League Cup that season. In November 2002, Dunning joined Torquay United on loan, scoring the first league goal of his career in the 3–1 win at home to Southend United, having replaced the injured Martin Gritton in the 5th minute of the game. In January 2003, he moved to Macclesfield Town on loan until the end of the season, when he was released by Blackburn.

In July 2003 he signed for York City and was a regular in the York side relegated to the Conference National at the end of the season. He remained with York until June 2006, when he left after rejecting a new contract with the club. The following month, he joined Conference North team Harrogate Town, teaming-up with his twin brother, Richard, and former York teammates Jamie Price and Dave Merris. He made his debut in a 1–0 victory against Moor Green and scored his first goal as Harrogate defeated Barrow 3–2. Dunning finished his first season, 2006–07, by starting in all of Harrogate's 48 games, as well as scoring five goals. He signed a new contract with the club in June 2008. He joined fellow Conference North team Gainsborough Trinity in May 2009. Dunning retired in 2010 due to knee ligament damage.

== Personal life ==
As of 2019, Dunning resides in York, runs his own plumbing company and has coached a successful local amateur football team.
