= Ernie Wardle =

English footballer

Personal information
- Full name: Ernest Wardle
- Date of birth: 13 June 1930
- Place of birth: Stockton-on-Tees, County Durham, England
- Date of death: March 2003 (aged 72)
- Place of death: Stockton-on-Tees, County Durham, England
- Height: 5 ft 9 1/2 in (1.77 m)
- Position: Full back

Senior career*
Years	Team	Apps	(Gls)
–1948	Billingham Synthonia		
1948–1955	Middlesbrough	0	(0)
1955–1959	York City	60	(2)
1959–	Billingham North End		
Total		60	(2)
- * Club domestic league appearances and goals

Ernest Wardle (13 June 1930 – March 2013) was an English professional footballer who played as a full back in the Football League for York City, in non-League football for Billingham Synthonia and Billingham North End and was on the books of Middlesbrough without making a league appearance.
