= Gordon Staniforth =

English association football player

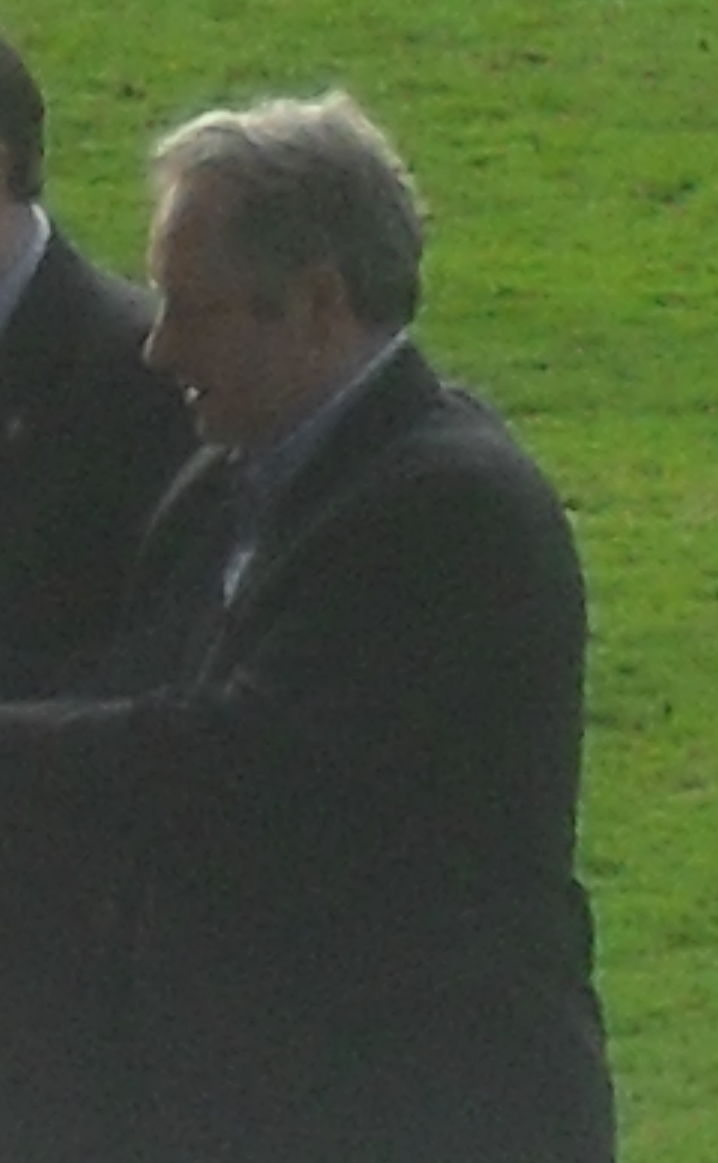
- Staniforth in 2011

Personal information
- Full name: Gordon Staniforth
- Date of birth: 23 March 1957 (age 69)
- Place of birth: Hull, England
- Height: 5 ft 7 in (1.70 m)
- Position: Striker

Youth career
- ?–1974: Hull City

Senior career*
Years	Team	Apps	(Gls)
1974–1976	Hull City	12	(2)
1976–1979	York City	128	(33)
1979–1983	Carlisle United	126	(33)
1983–1985	Plymouth Argyle	91	(19)
1985–1987	Newport County	87	(13)
1987–1988	York City	19	(1)
1988–1989	North Ferriby United		
Total		463	(101)

International career
1972	England Schoolboys	2	(0)

Managerial career
- 2013–2014: Doncaster Rovers Belles
- * Club domestic league appearances and goals

Gordon Staniforth (born 23 March 1957) is an English football coach and former player. He played in the Football League for Hull City, York City (two separate spells), Carlisle United, Plymouth Argyle and Newport County. He also played for England at schoolboy international level. From November 2013 to October 2014 Staniforth was head coach of FA WSL 2 club Doncaster Rovers Belles.

== Career ==
Born in Hull, East Riding of Yorkshire to Sidney Staniforth and Marian (Hardey), Staniforth attended Greatfield High School. He began his career as an apprentice with Hull City and he signed a professional contract with the club in April 1974. He made his first team debut in a 1–0 defeat to Swindon Town on 15 April. He joined York City on a one-month loan in December 1976, making his debut in a 3–2 defeat at Sheffield Wednesday on 27 December. He signed for York permanently in January 1977 for a fee of £7,500. He scored 33 times in 128 league games, also becoming Clubman of the Year in consecutive seasons, the first player to ever do so.

He moved to Carlisle United in October 1979 for a fee of £120,000. He joined Plymouth Argyle in March 1983 in a player exchange with Mike McCartney plus £5,000 and was part of the side that reached an FA Cup semi-final. In August 1985 he moved to Newport County in a player exchange with Steve Cooper plus £15,000. He returned to York in October 1987 on non-contract terms to end his professional career. He finished his career in non-League football with North Ferriby United, whom he signed for in July 1988 and departed in September 1989.

After retiring, he worked as Community Officer at York from 1989 to December 1996, when he became a North Regional coach for the Professional Footballers' Association. He was appointed youth coach at Leeds United in October 1997 before being sacked in May 1998 after just seven months of a three-year contract.

He then worked as co-ordinator of York College's Football Development Centre, alongside former York City goalkeeper Andy Leaning. The centre was awarded FA Charter status in 2005.

On 6 November 2013 Staniforth was announced as FA WSL club Doncaster Rovers Belles's new head coach. He would work under director of football Julie Chipchase, who said the appointment was made only after "a rigorous interview and practical coaching assignment". Staniforth led the team to five straight wins in his first five league games in charge and the Belles lost only one league match all season but finished behind Sunderland. On 30 October 2014, he resigned as Head Coach at the club, disgruntled at scything cuts to the club's playing budget.

== Personal life ==
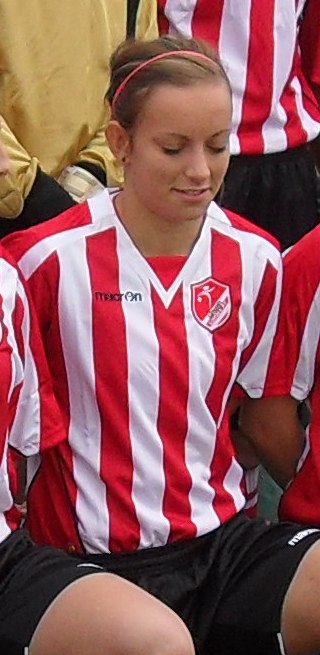
Lucy Staniforth in September 2010

Staniforth's son Tom (1980–2001) was also a footballer. He was a professional with Sheffield Wednesday, but never played a competitive first team game. He was however a first team substitute on six occasions, including games against Manchester United and Arsenal. He died in York on the night of 20 August 2001, aged 20, having collapsed in the street after complaining of headaches. On 31 January 2002, a local man—and former York City youth team goalkeeper—was charged with supplying ecstasy to Tom Staniforth. The man was later acquitted on this charge after the prosecution failed to offer any evidence against him. Since his son's death, Gordon Staniforth has been involved in anti-drug campaigning.

His daughter, Lucy Staniforth, plays in the FA WSL for Aston Villa and is also an England international who featured in the 2019 Women's World Cup in France. Lucy wears number 37—Tom's old Sheffield Wednesday squad number. After hitting the first goal in Lincoln Ladies' 3–0 WSL win at Doncaster Rovers Belles, Lucy revealed a T-shirt paying tribute to Tom on the tenth anniversary of his death.

== Managerial statistics ==
As of 26 October 2014

Club	From	To	Record				
Club	From	To	G	W	D	L	Win %
Doncaster Rovers Belles	6 November 2013	30 October 2014	26	18	3	5	69.23
