= Sam Ranby =

English footballer

Personal information
- Full name: Samuel Ranby
- Date of birth: 19 October 1897
- Place of birth: Hull, England
- Date of death: 25 January 1958 (aged 60)
- Position: Inside forward

Senior career*
Years	Team	Apps	(Gls)
?–1920	Gilberdyke		
1920–1921	Hull City	1	(0)
1921–?	Reckitt's		
?–1925	Selby Town		
1925–1929	York City	158	(40)
1929–?	Selby Town		
- * Club domestic league appearances and goals

Samuel Ranby (29 October 1897 – 20 January 1958) was an English footballer.

Ranby played for Gilberdyke, Hull City, Reckitt's, Selby Town and York City.
