= Alan Monkhouse =

English footballer

Personal information
- Full name: Alan Thompson William Monkhouse
- Date of birth: 23 October 1930
- Place of birth: Stockton-on-Tees, England
- Date of death: 1992 (aged 61–62)
- Position: Forward

Senior career*
Years	Team	Apps	(Gls)
	Thornaby	?	(?)
1949–1953	Millwall	65	(20)
1953–1956	Newcastle United	21	(9)
1956–1957	York City	12	(1)
	South Shields	?	(?)
Total		98	(30)
- * Club domestic league appearances and goals

Alan Thompson William Monkhouse (1930–1992) was an English footballer who played as a forward in the Football League.

== Club career ==
Monkhouse's first club was Thornaby. From 1949 to 1953, he played for Millwall, where he scored 20 goals in 65 appearances. He then played for Newcastle United, costing £11,500. He made his debut for the Magpies in a 4–0 home win over Cardiff City. Although regarded as strong and powerful, he could not displace the more famous names in his position, such as Vic Keeble and Jackie Milburn. He scored 9 goals in 21 appearances, and was sold to York City for £4,000. He stayed at York for a season, until he moved on to play for South Shields in the semi-professional North Eastern League. He became known as a penalty kick specialist and was quoted as one of the most consistent spot kickers in the North-East.

Monkhouse died in 1992.
