= John Stewart (footballer, born 1937) =

English footballer

Personal information
- Full name: John Barry Stewart
- Date of birth: 28 March 1937 (age 89)
- Place of birth: Middlesbrough, England
- Height: 5 ft 8 1/2 in (1.74 m)
- Position: Winger

Senior career*
Years	Team	Apps	(Gls)
- Whitby Town
1956–1957	York City	1	(0)
1957–	Darlington	0	(0)
Total		1	(0)
- * Club domestic league appearances and goals

John Barry Stewart (born 28 March 1937) is an English former professional footballer who played as a winger in the Football League for York City, in non-League football for Whitby Town, and was on the books of Darlington without making a league appearance.
