= William Edgar Hughes =

American politician (1840–1918)

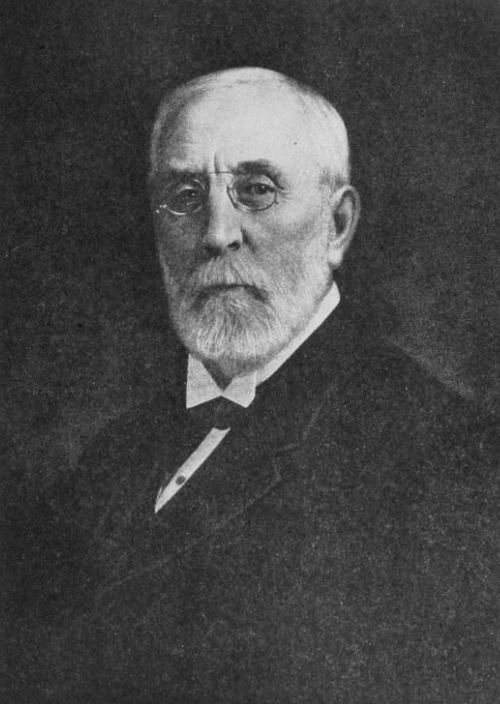

Member of the Texas House of Representatives
- In office February 9, 1870 – March 1, 1871

Personal details
- Born: March 15, 1840 Jacksonville, Illinois, US
- Died: July 29, 1918 (aged 78) Denver, Colorado, US
- Resting place: Fairmount Cemetery
- Party: Democratic
- Spouse: Annie C. Peete (m. 1867)
- Education: Illinois College

William Edgar Hughes (March 15, 1840 – July 29, 1918) was an American politician from Texas.

== Biography ==
Hughes was a Jacksonville, Illinois, native, born to parents John and Eliza on March 15, 1840. He graduated from Illinois College and started reading law.

In 1859, Hughes drove 3,000 sheep from Missouri to Texas, and chose to stay. He settled in Dallas County, raising sheep. Hughes was visiting family in Illinois when Texas seceded from the Union in 1861. Upon his return to Texas, Hughes enlisted in an artillery battery led by John Jay Good, and later by James Postell Douglas. Fighting alongside the Confederate Army of Tennessee, Hughes's battery saw action throughout the Western Theater of the American Civil War. He was injured in the left hand during the Battle of Chickamauga. By the Atlanta campaign, Hughes had been promoted to captain, and transferred to the cavalry brigade led by Benjamin J. Hill. In January 1865, Hughes became commander of the Thirteenth Confederate States Cavalry. Following the end of the American Civil War, Hughes settled in Weatherford, Texas.

Hughes was a schoolteacher for five months, then ran a salt works in Shackelford County. He continued his legal studies, and was later admitted to the bar. Hughes married Fort Worth native Annie C. Peete on November 21, 1867, and they had one daughter. In 1870, he was elected to the Texas House of Representatives as a Democrat from Weatherford. Hughes sat in the Twelfth Texas Legislature from February 9, 1870, to his resignation on March 1, 1871, and was succeeded in office by Absolom Gant. In 1873, Hughes moved to Dallas, and was elected the inaugural president of the City Bank of Dallas, later renamed the City National Bank. While working for the bank, Hughes practiced law and traded livestock and real estate.

In 1880, Hughes moved to St. Louis, Missouri, to lead the Continental Land and Cattle Company as president. Hughes was elected president of the Dallas-based Exchange (National) Bank in 1884. He moved to Denver, Colorado in 1889, and two years later, organized the Continental Trust Company. From 1891, Hughes served concurrently as president of the Union Trust Company of St. Louis.

Following the advice of his only granddaughter, Hughes wrote a memoir in 1912. He died from pneumonia in Denver on July 29, 1918, and was buried at Fairmount Cemetery.
