= Peter Scott (footballer, born 1952) =

English-born Northern Irish footballer (1952–2024)

Personal information
- Full name: Peter William Scott
- Date of birth: 19 September 1952
- Place of birth: Liverpool, England
- Date of death: 20 December 2024 (aged 72)
- Height: 5 ft 10 in (1.78 m)
- Position: Full back

Senior career*
Years	Team	Apps	(Gls)
1970–1975	Everton	44	(1)
1974	→ Southport (loan)	4	(0)
1975–1979	York City	100	(3)
1979–1983	Aldershot	121	(2)

International career
- England Youth
1975-1979	Northern Ireland	10	(0)
- * Club domestic league appearances and goals

Peter William Scott (19 September 1952 – 20 December 2024) was an English-born Northern Irish footballer. He represented England at Youth level and Northern Ireland at full international level, making a total of 10 appearances for the team.

== Career ==
Scott served his apprenticeship with Everton and signed full-time professional terms with the club in July 1970. He made his First Division debut in the 1971–72 season. He joined Southport on loan in January 1974 and made four league appearances for the club. He joined York City for a fee in the region of £11,000 in December 1975, after making 44 appearances and scoring one goal in the league for Everton. He made a total of 114 appearances and scored three goals for the club, and was their most capped player after making seven appearances for Northern Ireland whilst with them. He joined Aldershot in March 1979 for a fee of £3,000, for whom he made 121 appearances and scored two goals in the league. He made a total of 10 appearances for Northern Ireland, but was also an England Youth international.

== Death ==
Scott died on 20 December 2024, at the age of 72.
