= Clive Colbridge =

English footballer (1934–2020)

Personal information
- Date of birth: 27 April 1934
- Place of birth: Hull, England
- Date of death: 21 March 2014 (aged 79)
- Place of death: East Riding of Yorkshire, England
- Position: Winger

Youth career
- Hull City
- 1952–1955: Leeds United

Senior career*
Years	Team	Apps	(Gls)
1955–1957	York City	37	(14)
1957–1958	Workington	46	(8)
1958–1959	Crewe Alexandra	29	(8)
1959–1962	Manchester City	62	(12)
1962–1965	Wrexham	108	(33)
- Altrincham
Total		282	(75)
- * Club domestic league appearances and goals

Clive Colbridge (27 April 1934 – 21 March 2014) was an English footballer who played as a winger in the Football League for York City, Workington, Crewe Alexandra, Manchester City and Wrexham. Colbridge died in the East Riding of Yorkshire on 21 March 2014, at the age of 79.
