= Peter Wragg =

English footballer

Personal information
- Full name: Peter Wragg
- Date of birth: 12 January 1931
- Place of birth: Rotherham, England
- Date of death: 24 June 2004 (aged 73)
- Place of death: Plymouth, England
- Height: 5 ft 8 in (1.73 m)
- Position: Inside forward

Senior career*
Years	Team	Apps	(Gls)
1948–1953	Rotherham United	31	(6)
1953–1956	Sheffield United	56	(17)
1956–1963	York City	264	(78)
1963–1965	Bradford City	73	(5)
Total		424	(106)
- * Club domestic league appearances and goals

Peter Wragg (12 January 1931 – 24 June 2004) was an English footballer who played as an inside forward.

== Career ==
Born in Rotherham, West Riding of Yorkshire, Wragg played for Rotherham United, Sheffield United, York City and Bradford City. He scored 106 total goals in 424 career appearances. He died in Plymouth, Devon on 24 June 2004.
