= Ron Mollatt =

English footballer (1932–2001)

Personal information
- Full name: Ronald Vincent Mollatt
- Date of birth: 24 February 1932
- Place of birth: Edwinstowe, England
- Date of death: 16 January 2001 (aged 68)
- Position: Wing half

Senior career*
Years	Team	Apps	(Gls)
	Thoresby Colliery	?	(?)
1950–1955	Leeds United	17	(0)
1955–1960	York City	124	(1)
1960–1962	Bradford City	88	(0)
	Frickley Colliery	?	(?)
- * Club domestic league appearances and goals

Ronald Vincent Mollatt (24 February 1932 in Edwinstowe, England – 16 January 2001 in Dringhouses) was an English footballer.
