= Billy Hughes (footballer, born May 1929) =

Association footballer from Northern Ireland

Personal information
- Full name: William Hughes
- Date of birth: 9 May 1929
- Place of birth: Ballymena, Northern Ireland
- Date of death: June 2005 (aged 76)
- Place of death: Salford, England
- Height: 5 ft 5 1/2 in (1.66 m)
- Position: Right winger

Senior career*
Years	Team	Apps	(Gls)
- Larne
1948–1953	Bolton Wanderers	47	(2)
1953–1954	Bournemouth and Boscombe Athletic	16	(1)
- Rhyl
- Bangor City
- Mossley

International career
1951	Northern Ireland	1	(0)
- * Club domestic league appearances and goals

William Hughes (9 May 1929 – June 2005) was a Northern Irish footballer who played as a right winger.

== Career ==
Born in Ballymena, Hughes played for Larne, Bolton Wanderers, Bournemouth and Boscombe Athletic, Rhyl, Bangor City and Mossley. He also earned one cap for the Northern Ireland national team.
