= Gordon Brown (footballer, born 1929) =

English footballer

Personal information
- Full name: Gordon Steele Brown
- Date of birth: 21 March 1929
- Place of birth: Church Warsop, England
- Date of death: 15 August 2010 (aged 81)
- Place of death: Nottingham, England
- Height: 5 ft 9 in (1.75 m)
- Position: Wing half

Senior career*
Years	Team	Apps	(Gls)
1946–1950	Nottingham Forest	1	(0)
1950–1958	York City	322	(25)
1958–19??	Sutton United		
- Shirebrook Miners Welfare
Total		323	(25)
- * Club domestic league appearances and goals

Gordon Steele Brown (21 March 1929 – 15 August 2010) was an English footballer.

== Career ==
Born in Church Warsop, Nottinghamshire, Brown played junior football in Worksop before signing a professional contract with Nottingham Forest in December 1946. He joined York City in June 1950 after serving in the British Army in 1948 to 1949. He was a member of the team which played in the FA Cup semi-final in 1955. He left the club for non-League Sutton United in July 1958 and later played for Shirebrook Miners Welfare. Brown died at Nottingham City Hospital at the age of 81 on the morning of 15 August 2010.
