= Tommy Forgan =

English footballer (1929–2019)

Personal information
- Full name: Thomas Carr Forgan
- Date of birth: 12 October 1929
- Place of birth: Middlesbrough, England
- Date of death: 15 December 2019 (aged 90)
- Place of death: Perth, Australia
- Position: Goalkeeper

Senior career*
| Years | Team | Apps | (Gls) |
| 1949–1954 | Hull City | 10 | (0) |
| 1954–1965 | York City | 388 | (0) |
| 1965–? | Gainsborough Trinity | ? | (?) |
- * Club domestic league appearances and goals

Thomas Carr Forgan (12 October 1929 – 15 December 2019) was an English football goalkeeper.

Forgan joined York City for a fee of £500 in the summer of 1954 having been placed on the transfer list by his previous club Hull City where he had spent five years. He had previously played for Middlesbrough local non-league side Sutton Estates. He spent twelve years with York, making a total of 428 appearances. He was a part of the team which played in the FA Cup semi-final in 1955. He was selected to play for the Third Division North side against the South in April 1957. In 1966 he left to play for Gainsborough Trinity and later played for Mitre in the York & District League.

In 1974, he emigrated to Perth, Australia, working as a bricklayer until his retirement. He died in Perth, on 15 December 2019, aged 90.
