= Billy Hughes (footballer, born 1865) =

Welsh footballer

Personal information
- Date of birth: 1865
- Place of birth: Caernarfon, Wales
- Date of death: 14 November 1919 (aged 53–54)
- Position: Centre-half

Senior career*
Years	Team	Apps	(Gls)
1892–1893	Bootle	22	(1)
1893–?	Liverpool		

International career
1891–1892	Wales	3	(0)
- * Club domestic league appearances and goals

William Hughes (1865 – 14 November 1919) was a Welsh international footballer. He was part of the Wales national football team between 1891 and 1892, playing 3 matches. He played his first match on 7 March 1891 against England and his last match on 26 March 1892 against Scotland. He played his club football for Bootle, where he was an ever-present in the club's first season in the Football League, making 22 appearances. At the end of the 1892–93 season, however, Bootle resigned from the league. He subsequently joined Liverpool. An obituary described him as "one of the best centre half-backs that Bootle boasted".

After his playing career ended, he worked as a steward for the White Star Company. He died in a motorcycle accident in November 1919.

== See also ==
- List of Wales international footballers (alphabetical)
