= Billy Hughes (footballer, born 1920) =

Welsh footballer

Personal information
- Full name: William Henry Hughes
- Date of birth: 2 October 1920
- Place of birth: Cardiff, Wales
- Date of death: 30 March 1995 (aged 74)
- Place of death: Hartlepool, England
- Position: Centre half

Youth career
- Newcastle United

Senior career*
Years	Team	Apps	(Gls)
1946–1950	Hartlepool United	124	(2)
- Annfield Plain
Total		124	(2)
- * Club domestic league appearances and goals

William Henry Hughes (2 October 1920 – 30 March 1995) was a Welsh professional footballer who played for Newcastle United, Hartlepool United and Annfield Plain, as a centre half.
