= Ernie Phillips (footballer) =

English footballer

Personal information
- Full name: Ernest Phillips
- Date of birth: 29 November 1923
- Place of birth: North Shields, England
- Date of death: 10 January 2004 (aged 80)
- Place of death: York, England
- Position: Full back

Senior career*
Years	Team	Apps	(Gls)
	Ashington	?	(?)
1948–1951	Manchester City	80	(0)
1951–1953	Hull City	42	(0)
1954–1957	York City	164	(2)
	Ashington	?	(?)
- * Club domestic league appearances and goals

Ernest Phillips (born 29 November 1923 in North Shields, England, died 10 January 2004) was an English footballer.

Phillips joined Manchester City from non-league side Ashington in 1948. He joined Hull City in 1951. He joined York City in 1954, where he was a part of the team which played in the FA Cup semi-final in 1955. He then re-joined non-league side Ashington in 1958.
