= Billy Hughes (footballer, born March 1929) =

Scottish footballer

Personal information
- Full name: William Hughes
- Date of birth: 3 March 1929
- Place of birth: Glasgow, Scotland
- Date of death: 17 October 2003 (aged 74)
- Place of death: West Knapton, England
- Height: 5 ft 8 1/2 in (1.74 m)
- Position: Winger

Senior career*
Years	Team	Apps	(Gls)
?–1951	Newcastle United	0	(0)
1951–1962	York City	349	(55)
Total		349	(55)
- * Club domestic league appearances and goals

William Hughes (3 March 1929 – 17 October 2003) was a Scottish footballer who played as a winger.

== Career ==
Born in Glasgow, Hughes played for Newcastle United as an amateur before signing professional terms with York City in May 1951. He was a part of the team which played in the FA Cup semi-final in 1955. He died in West Knapton, North Yorkshire at the age of 74 on 17 October 2003.
