= 1997–98 York City F.C. season =

Association football club season

York City F.C.
1997–98 season
- Chairman: Douglas Craig
- Manager: Alan Little
- Ground: Bootham Crescent
- Football League Second Division: 16th
- FA Cup: Second round (eliminated by Wigan Athletic)
- League Cup: Second round (eliminated by Oxford United)
- Football League Trophy: Northern section second round (eliminated by Blackpool)
- Top goalscorer: League: Rodney Rowe (11); All: Rodney Rowe (16)
- Highest home attendance: 7,093 vs Grimsby Town, Second Division, 26 December 1997
- Lowest home attendance: 1,555 vs Oxford United, League Cup, 23 September 1997
- Average home league attendance: 3,850

The 1997–98 season was the 76th season of competitive association football and 69th season in the Football League played by York City Football Club, a professional football club based in York, North Yorkshire, England. They finished in 16th position in the 24-team 1997–98 Football League Second Division. They were eliminated from the 1997–98 FA Cup in the second round by Wigan Athletic, from the 1997–98 League Cup in the second round by Oxford United, and from the 1997–98 Football League Trophy in the Northern section second round by Blackpool.

28 players made at least one appearance in nationally organised first-team competition, and there were 16 different goalscorers. Midfielder Mark Tinkler missed only two of the 53 competitive matches played over the season. Striker Rodney Rowe finished as leading goalscorer with 16 goals, of which 11 came in league competition, three came in the FA Cup, one came in the League Cup and one came in the Football League Trophy.

== Match details ==
=== Football League Second Division ===
Football League Second Division match details
Date	League position	Opponents	Venue	Result	Score F–A	Scorers	Attendance
9 August 1997	18th	Oldham Athletic	A	L	1–3	Bushell 65'	6,474
16 August 1997	23rd	Bristol Rovers	H	L	0–1		3,307
23 August 1997	18th	Millwall	A	W	3–2	Rowe 45', Pouton 63', Stephenson 86'	6,583
30 August 1997	10th	Gillingham	H	W	2–1	Rowe 60', Greening 88'	2,853
2 September 1997	14th	Chesterfield	H	L	0–1		3,284
9 September 1997	16th	Grimsby Town	A	D	0–0		5,308
13 September 1997	12th	Burnley	H	W	3–1	Davis 62', Rowe 64', Tolson 82'	5,424
20 September 1997	15th	Walsall	A	L	0–2		2,972
27 September 1997	17th	Watford	A	D	1–1	Tolson 34'	13,812
4 October 1997	9th	Plymouth Argyle	H	W	1–0	Rowe 8'	2,894
11 October 1997	6th	Brentford	H	W	3–1	Stephenson 17', Tinkler 51', Murty 66'	2,831
17 October 1997	8th	Bristol City	A	L	1–2	Rowe 37'	9,568
21 October 1997	11th	Northampton Town	A	D	1–1	Rowe 48'	6,059
25 October 1997	6th	Carlisle United	H	W	4–3	Rowe 14', Stephenson (2) 82', 85' Bushell 87'	3,700
1 November 1997	6th	Wigan Athletic	A	D	1–1	Rowe 76'	3,701
4 November 1997	6th	Preston North End	H	W	1–0	Tinkler 61'	3,370
8 November 1997	3rd	Wycombe Wanderers	H	W	2–0	Barras 45' pen., Rowe 56'	3,343
18 November 1997	5th	Fulham	A	D	1–1	Barras 19' pen.	5,521
22 November 1997	5th	Blackpool	A	L	0–1		4,508
29 November 1997	7th	Luton Town	H	L	1–2	Cresswell 87'	3,636
2 December 1997	7th	AFC Bournemouth	A	D	0–0		3,365
13 December 1997	5th	Wrexham	H	W	1–0	Barras 62'	2,871
19 December 1997	4th	Southend United	A	D	4–4	Pouton (2) 22', 66', Barras 45' pen., Tinkler 88'	3,215
26 December 1997	5th	Grimsby Town	H	D	0–0		7,093
28 December 1997	8th	Chesterfield	A	D	1–1	Greening 90'	5,320
10 January 1998	9th	Oldham Athletic	H	D	0–0		4,454
17 January 1998	10th	Gillingham	A	D	0–0		5,891
24 January 1998	10th	Millwall	H	L	2–3	Stephenson 11', Bull 89'	3,508
31 January 1998	12th	Burnley	A	L	2–7	Pouton 34', Barras 76'	9,975
7 February 1998	9th	Walsall	H	W	1–0	Tinkler 27'	2,959
14 February 1998	12th	Plymouth Argyle	A	D	0–0		4,382
21 February 1998	13th	Watford	H	D	1–1	Barras 26' pen.	4,980
24 February 1998	13th	Bristol City	H	L	0–1		3,770
28 February 1998	13th	Brentford	A	W	2–1	Gabbiadini 50', Jones 70'	4,490
3 March 1998	14th	Wycombe Wanderers	A	L	0–1		3,768
7 March 1998	13th	Wigan Athletic	H	D	2–2	Thompson 46', Bushell 53'	3,536
10 March 1998	10th	Bristol Rovers	A	W	2–1	Jones 34', Cresswell 72'	4,289
14 March 1998	11th	Preston North End	A	L	2–3	Rowe (2) 2', 77'	7,664
21 March 1998	15th	Fulham	H	L	0–1		4,871
28 March 1998	12th	Blackpool	H	D	1–1	Cresswell 90'	3,650
4 April 1998	15th	Luton Town	A	L	0–3		5,541
11 April 1998	18th	AFC Bournemouth	H	L	0–1		2,840
13 April 1998	15th	Wrexham	A	W	2–1	Thompson 67' pen., Cresswell 81'	5,231
18 April 1998	15th	Southend United	H	D	1–1	Tolson 74'	2,850
25 April 1998	13th	Carlisle United	A	W	2–1	Pouton 63', McMillan 84'	3,897
2 May 1998	16th	Northampton Town	H	D	0–0		6,688

=== League table (part) ===
Final Football League Second Division table (part)
Pos	Club	Pld	W	D	L	F	A	GD	Pts
14th	Wycombe Wanderers	46	14	18	14	51	53	−2	60
15th	Preston North End	46	15	14	17	56	56	0	59
16th	York City	46	14	17	15	52	58	−6	59
17th	Luton Town	46	14	15	17	60	64	−4	57
18th	Millwall	46	14	13	19	43	54	−11	55
Key	Pos = League position; Pld = Matches played; W = Matches won; D = Matches drawn; L = Matches lost; F = Goals for; A = Goals against; GD = Goal difference; Pts = Points								
Source									

=== FA Cup ===
FA Cup match details
Round	Date	Opponents	Venue	Result	Score F–A	Scorers	Attendance
First round	15 November 1997	Southport	A	W	4–0	Rowe (2) 18', 68', Bolland 69' o.g., Pouton 75'	3,962
Second round	6 December 1997	Wigan Athletic	A	L	1–2	Rowe 82'	4,021

=== League Cup ===
League Cup match details
Round	Date	Opponents	Venue	Result	Score F–A	Scorers	Attendance
First round first leg	12 August 1997	Port Vale	A	W	2–1	Bull 32', Bushell 90'	2,749
First round second leg	26 August 1997	Port Vale	H	D	1–1; 3–2 agg.	Barras 37'	3,195
Second round first leg	16 September 1997	Oxford United	A	L	1–4	Rowe 43'	2,923
Second round second leg	23 September 1997	Oxford United	H	L	1–2; 2–6 agg.	Murty 62'	1,555

=== Football League Trophy ===
Football League Trophy match details
Round	Date	Opponents	Venue	Result	Score F–A	Scorers	Attendance
Northern section second round	6 January 1998	Blackpool	A	D	1–1 a.e.t. 9–10 pens.	Rowe 23'	1,105

== Appearances and goals ==
Numbers in parentheses denote appearances as substitute.
Players with names struck through and marked † left the club during the playing season.
Players with names in italics and marked * were on loan from another club for the whole of their season with York.
Key to positions: GK – Goalkeeper; DF – Defender; MF – Midfielder; FW – Forward

Players included in matchday squads
Pos.	Nat.	Name	League		FA Cup		League Cup		FL Trophy		Total		Discipline	
Pos.	Nat.	Name	Apps	Goals	Apps	Goals	Apps	Goals	Apps	Goals	Apps	Goals	A yellow rectangle, denoting the yellow penalty card shown to a player being cautioned	A red rectangle, denoting the red penalty card shown to a player being sent off
GK	ENG	Michael Norris	0	0	0	0	0	0	0	0	0	0	0	0
GK	ENG	Mark Samways	29	0	1	0	4	0	0	0	34	0	1	0
GK	ENG	Andy Warrington	17	0	1	0	0	0	1	0	19	0	0	0
DF	ENG	Paddy Atkinson	3 (2)	0	0 (1)	0	0	0	0 (1)	0	3 (4)	0	0	0
DF	ENG	Tony Barras	38	6	2	0	4	1	0	0	44	7	5	0
DF	ENG	~~Steve Davis~~ * †	2	1	0	0	0	0	0	0	2	1	0	0
DF	ENG	Andy Dawson	0	0	0	0	0	0	0	0	0	0	0	0
DF	ENG	Wayne Hall	31 (1)	0	1	0	4	0	1	0	37 (1)	0	1	0
DF	ENG	Gary Himsworth	9 (6)	0	1 (1)	0	0	0	0	0	10 (7)	0	0	0
DF	ENG	Barry Jones	23	2	0	0	0	0	0	0	23	2	2	0
DF	RSA	Andy McMillan	30	1	0	0	4	0	0	0	34	1	0	1
DF	ENG	Graeme Murty	32 (2)	1	2	0	2	1	1	0	37 (2)	2	1	0
DF	ENG	Martin Reed	21 (1)	0	2	0	2	0	1	0	26 (1)	0	5	0
DF	ENG	Graham Rennison	1	0	0	0	0	0	0	0	1	0	1	1
DF	ENG	Neil Thompson *	12	2	0	0	0	0	0	0	12	2	0	0
DF	ENG	~~Steve Tutill~~ †	2	0	0	0	1	0	0	0	3	0	0	0
MF	ENG	Steve Bushell	40	3	2	0	4	1	1	0	47	4	9	0
MF	ENG	Martin Garratt	0	0	0	0	0	0	0	0	0	0	0	0
MF	ENG	~~Jonathan Greening~~ †	5 (15)	2	0	0	0 (1)	0	1	0	6 (16)	2	0	0
MF	ENG	Scott Jordan	6 (10)	0	0 (1)	0	0	0	1	0	7 (11)	0	0	0
MF	ENG	Alan Pouton	37 (4)	5	2	1	3 (1)	0	1	0	43 (5)	6	6	0
MF	ENG	~~Paul Stephenson~~ †	34 (1)	5	2	0	3 (1)	0	0	0	39 (2)	5	4	0
MF	ENG	Mark Tinkler	43 (1)	4	2	0	4	0	1	0	50 (1)	4	9	1
FW	ENG	Richard Alderson	0 (1)	0	0	0	0	0	0 (1)	0	0 (2)	0	0	0
FW	ENG	Gary Bull	18 (9)	1	1 (1)	0	3 (1)	1	0	0	22 (11)	2	1	0
FW	ENG	~~Neil Campbell~~ †	1	0	0	0	1	0	0	0	2	0	0	0
FW	ENG	Richard Cresswell	18 (8)	4	1 (1)	0	0 (1)	0	1	0	20 (10)	4	4	0
FW	ENG	Marco Gabbiadini	5 (2)	1	0	0	0	0	0	0	5 (2)	1	0	0
FW	ENG	Rodney Rowe	38 (3)	11	2	3	3	1	1	1	44 (3)	16	4	0
FW	ENG	~~David Rush~~ †	1 (2)	0	0	0	0	0	0	0	1 (2)	0	0	0
FW	ENG	Neil Tolson	10 (6)	3	0	0	2 (1)	0	0	0	12 (7)	3	2	1

== See also ==
- List of York City F.C. seasons
