= 1996–97 York City F.C. season =

Association football club season

York City F.C.
1996–97 season
- Chairman: Douglas Craig
- Manager: Alan Little
- Ground: Bootham Crescent
- Football League Second Division: 20th
- FA Cup: Third round (eliminated by Hednesford Town)
- League Cup: Third round (eliminated by Leicester City)
- Football League Trophy: Northern section quarter-final (eliminated by Carlisle United)
- Top goalscorer: League: Nigel Pepper; Neil Tolson (12); All: Neil Tolson (17)
- Highest home attendance: 8,406 vs Leicester City, League Cup, 22 October 1996
- Lowest home attendance: 1,428 vs Preston North End, Football League Trophy, 21 January 1997
- Average home league attendance: 3,359

The 1996–97 season was the 75th season of competitive association football and 68th season in the Football League played by York City Football Club, a professional football club based in York, North Yorkshire, England. They finished in 20th position in the 24-team 1996–97 Football League Second Division. They were eliminated from the 1996–97 FA Cup in the third round by Hednesford Town, from the 1996–97 League Cup in the third round by Leicester City, and from the 1996–97 Football League Trophy in the Northern section quarter-final by Carlisle United.

31 players made at least one appearance in nationally organised first-team competition, and there were 16 different goalscorers. Defender Tony Barras played in all 57 first-team matches over the season. Neil Tolson finished as leading goalscorer with 17 goals, of which 12 came in league competition, two came in the FA Cup and three came in the League Cup.

== Match details ==
=== Football League Second Division ===
Football League Second Division match details
Date	League position	Opponents	Venue	Result	Score F–A	Scorers	Attendance
17 August 1996	16th	Plymouth Argyle	A	L	1–2	Pepper 79' pen.	9,035
24 August 1996	23rd	AFC Bournemouth	H	L	1–2	Pepper 81'	2,804
27 August 1996	16th	Millwall	H	W	3–2	Pepper (2) 57', 62', Tolson 71'	3,108
31 August 1996	8th	Notts County	A	W	1–0	Tolson 23'	4,600
7 September 1996	9th	Shrewsbury Town	H	D	0–0		2,911
10 September 1996	13th	Preston North End	A	L	0–1		7,608
14 September 1996	13th	Peterborough United	A	D	2–2	Bushell 58', Pepper 85'	5,613
21 September 1996	18th	Stockport County	H	L	1–2	Tolson 47'	3,061
28 September 1996	19th	Brentford	A	D	3–3	Tolson 3', Randall 49', Murty 71'	5,243
1 October 1996	19th	Bristol Rovers	H	D	2–2	Tolson 13', Randall 53'	3,714
5 October 1996	19th	Watford	H	L	1–2	Pepper 80' pen.	5,232
11 October 1996	20th	Bristol City	A	L	0–2		9,308
15 October 1996	21st	Crewe Alexandra	A	W	1–0	Himsworth 81'	3,463
19 October 1996	16th	Rotherham United	H	W	2–1	Stephenson 81', Pepper 90'	3,410
26 October 1996	16th	Chesterfield	A	L	0–2		4,009
29 October 1996	14th	Wycombe Wanderers	H	W	2–0	Pepper 36' pen., Tolson 53'	2,254
2 November 1996	13th	Burnley	H	W	1–0	Murty 61'	5,958
9 November 1996	13th	Bury	A	L	1–4	Himsworth 21'	4,021
23 November 1996	13th	Gillingham	A	W	1–0	Tolson 24'	5,048
30 November 1996	14th	Chesterfield	H	D	0–0		3,328
3 December 1996	14th	Luton Town	A	L	0–2		4,401
14 December 1996	12th	Wrexham	H	W	1–0	Humes 89' o.g.	2,600
21 December 1996	15th	Blackpool	A	L	0–3		3,432
28 December 1996	17th	Shrewsbury Town	A	L	0–2		3,189
11 January 1997	19th	Brentford	H	L	2–4	Pepper 45' pen., Pouton 80'	3,085
18 January 1997	19th	Bristol Rovers	A	D	1–1	Pepper 1' pen.	4,470
25 January 1997	20th	Wycombe Wanderers	A	L	1–3	Campbell 70'	4,193
1 February 1997	20th	Bury	H	L	0–2		3,423
8 February 1997	20th	Burnley	A	W	2–1	Tolson 6', Jordan 90'	8,961
11 February 1997	20th	Walsall	H	L	0–2		2,136
15 February 1997	20th	Gillingham	H	L	2–3	Bushell 23', Barras 79'	2,748
22 February 1997	20th	Walsall	A	D	1–1	Pepper 21' pen.	3,664
25 February 1997	20th	Preston North End	H	W	3–1	Bull 57', Pepper 65', Rowe 81'	2,515
1 March 1997	20th	Luton Town	H	D	1–1	Tolson 48'	3,788
8 March 1997	19th	Blackpool	H	W	1–0	Sharples 19'	3,639
15 March 1997	19th	Wrexham	A	D	0–0		3,874
22 March 1997	18th	AFC Bournemouth	A	D	1–1	Gilbert 65'	4,367
29 March 1997	19th	Plymouth Argyle	H	D	1–1	Bushell 77'	3,917
2 April 1997	20th	Millwall	A	D	1–1	Tolson 48'	6,161
5 April 1997	20th	Notts County	H	L	1–2	Rowe 79'	3,115
8 April 1997	19th	Peterborough United	H	W	1–0	Bull 42'	2,790
12 April 1997	19th	Watford	A	L	0–4		7,645
19 April 1997	20th	Bristol City	H	L	0–3		3,344
22 April 1997	20th	Stockport County	A	L	1–2	Tolson 20'	6,654
26 April 1997	20th	Rotherham United	A	W	2–0	Rowe 45', Tolson 68'	3,122
3 May 1997	20th	Crewe Alexandra	H	D	1–1	Tinkler 25'	4,366

=== League table (part) ===
Final Football League Second Division table (part)
Pos	Club	Pld	W	D	L	F	A	GD	Pts
18th	Wycombe Wanderers	46	15	10	21	51	56	−5	55
19th	Plymouth Argyle	46	12	18	16	47	58	−11	54
20th	York City	46	13	13	20	47	68	−21	52
21st	Peterborough United	46	11	14	21	55	73	−18	47
22nd	Shrewsbury Town	46	11	13	22	49	74	−25	46
Key	Pos = League position; Pld = Matches played; W = Matches won; D = Matches drawn; L = Matches lost; F = Goals for; A = Goals against; GD = Goal difference; Pts = Points								
Source									

=== FA Cup ===
FA Cup match details
Round	Date	Opponents	Venue	Result	Score F–A	Scorers	Attendance
First round	16 November 1996	Hartlepool United	A	D	0–0		3,011
First round replay	26 November 1996	Hartlepool United	H	W	3–0	Pepper 41', Himsworth 45', Tolson 54'	3,227
Second round	7 December 1996	Preston North End	A	W	3–2	Moyes 16' o.g., Barras 40', Tolson 74'	7,893
Third round	13 January 1997	Hednesford Town	A	L	0–1		3,169

=== League Cup ===
League Cup match details
Round	Date	Opponents	Venue	Result	Score F–A	Scorers	Attendance
First round first leg	20 August 1996	Doncaster Rovers	A	D	1–1	Tolson 37'	1,852
First round second leg	3 September 1996	Doncaster Rovers	H	W	2–0; 3–1 agg.	Pepper 30', Bushell 81'	2,757
Second round first leg	18 September 1996	Everton	A	D	1–1	Tolson 55'	11,527
Second round second leg	24 September 1996	Everton	H	W	3–2; 4–3 agg.	Tolson 35', Bull 57', Murty 86'	7,854
Third round	22 October 1996	Leicester City	H	L	0–2		8,406

=== Football League Trophy ===
Football League Trophy match details
Round	Date	Opponents	Venue	Result	Score F–A	Scorers	Attendance
Northern section second round	21 January 1997	Preston North End	H	W	1–0	Himsworth	1,428
Northern section quarter-final	4 February 1997	Carlisle United	H	L	0–2		1,922

== Appearances and goals ==
Numbers in parentheses denote appearances as substitute.
Players with names struck through and marked † left the club during the playing season.
Players with names in italics and marked * were on loan from another club for the whole of their season with York.
Key to positions: GK – Goalkeeper; DF – Defender; MF – Midfielder; FW – Forward

Players included in matchday squads
Pos.	Nat.	Name	League		FA Cup		League Cup		FL Trophy		Total	
Pos.	Nat.	Name	Apps	Goals	Apps	Goals	Apps	Goals	Apps	Goals	Apps	Goals
GK	ENG	~~Tim Clarke~~ †	17	0	4	0	1	0	1	0	23	0
GK	ENG	~~Mark Prudhoe~~ * †	2	0	0	0	0	0	0	0	2	0
GK	ENG	Andy Warrington	27	0	0	0	4	0	1	0	32	0
DF	ENG	Paul Atkin	6 (6)	0	0	0	1	0	0	0	7 (6)	0
DF	ENG	Paddy Atkinson	13 (1)	0	3	0	0	0	2	0	18 (1)	0
DF	ENG	Tony Barras	46	1	4	1	5	0	2	0	57	2
DF	ENG	Wayne Hall	12 (1)	0	1	0	2	0	0	0	15 (1)	0
DF	RSA	Andy McMillan	46	0	3	0	5	0	2	0	56	0
DF	ENG	Martin Reed	2	0	0	0	0	0	0	0	2	0
DF	ENG	John Sharples	28	1	1	0	3	0	1	0	33	1
DF	ENG	Steve Tutill	13 (2)	0	3 (1)	0	1	0	1	0	18 (3)	0
MF	ENG	Steve Bushell	26 (5)	3	1	0	1 (1)	1	1	0	29 (6)	4
MF	ENG	~~Dave Gilbert~~ * †	9	1	0	0	0	0	0	0	9	1
MF	ENG	Jonathan Greening	0 (5)	0	0	0	0	0	0	0	0 (5)	0
MF	SCO	Tommy Harrison	0 (1)	0	0	0	0	0	0 (1)	0	0 (2)	0
MF	ENG	Gary Himsworth	32 (1)	2	4	1	4	0	2	1	42 (1)	4
MF	ENG	Scott Jordan	7 (8)	1	0 (1)	0	0	0	1	0	8 (9)	1
MF	ENG	Graeme Murty	25 (2)	2	3 (1)	0	5	1	1 (1)	0	34 (4)	3
MF	ENG	~~Nigel Pepper~~ †	26 (3)	12	3	1	4 (1)	1	1	0	34 (4)	14
MF	ENG	Alan Pouton	18 (4)	1	3	0	0	0	1	0	22 (4)	1
MF	ENG	~~Adrian Randall~~ †	13 (3)	2	0 (1)	0	5	0	0	0	18 (4)	2
MF	ENG	Paul Stephenson	33 (2)	1	3	0	4 (1)	0	1 (1)	0	41 (4)	1
MF	ENG	Mark Tinkler	9	1	0	0	0	0	0	0	9	1
MF	ENG	~~Darren Williams~~ †	0 (1)	0	0	0	0	0	0	0	0 (1)	0
FW	ENG	Gary Bull	33 (8)	2	4	0	4 (1)	1	0	0	41 (9)	3
FW	ENG	Neil Campbell	5 (6)	1	0 (2)	0	0	0	2	0	7 (8)	1
FW	ENG	Richard Cresswell	9 (8)	0	0 (1)	0	1 (2)	0	1	0	11 (11)	0
FW	ENG	~~Glenn Naylor~~ †	0 (1)	0	0	0	0 (1)	0	0	0	0 (2)	0
FW	ENG	Rodney Rowe	9 (1)	3	0	0	0	0	0	0	9 (1)	3
FW	ENG	David Rush	1 (1)	0	0	0	0	0	1	0	2 (1)	0
FW	ENG	Neil Tolson	39 (1)	12	4	2	5	3	0 (1)	0	48 (2)	17

== See also ==
- List of York City F.C. seasons
