= McNiven =

McNiven or MacNiven is a surname of Gaelic origin. It is derived from the Gaelic Mac Naoimhín. The latter surname is derived from a personal name based upon naomh ("holy", "saint"). The surname MacNiven can be rendered in Scottish Gaelic as Mac'IlleNaoimh.

== Surname ==
- Daniel McNiven (1902–????), Scottish footballer
- David McNiven (disambiguation), several people
  - David McNiven (footballer, born 1955), Scottish footballer
  - David McNiven (footballer, born 1978), English footballer
- Edward McNiven (1827–1858), English lawyer and cricketer
- Kate McNiven (date unclear), legendary Scottish witch
- John McNiven (disambiguation), multiple people
- Jock McNiven (1900–1969), Canadian mine engineer, mine operator and politician
- Julie McNiven (born 1980), American actress and singer
- Mary C. MacNiven (1905–1997), Scottish Gaelic singer
- Scott McNiven (born 1978), English-born Scottish footballer
- Steve McNiven, Canadian comic book artist
- Tyler MacNiven, American filmmaker and reality television contestant

== Given name ==
- David McNiven Garner (1928–2016), New Zealand physicist
