= Richard Alderson =

Richard Alderson may refer to:

- Richard Alderson (footballer) (born 1974), English footballer
- Richard Alderson (record producer) (born 1937), American audio engineer and record producer
