= Steve Halford =

English footballer (born 1980)

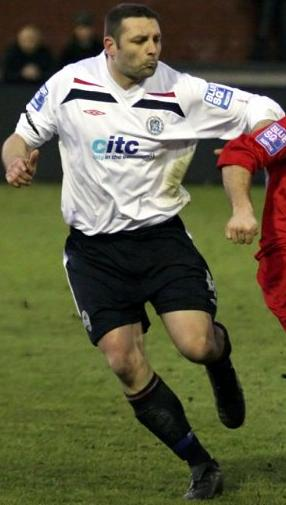

Personal information
- Full name: Stephen Paul Halford
- Date of birth: 21 September 1980 (age 46)
- Place of birth: Bury, England
- Position: Defender

Youth career
- 1994–1997: Bury

Senior career*
Years	Team	Apps	(Gls)
1997–2001	Bury	5	(0)
2001–2002	Chester City	10	(0)
2002–2004	Accrington Stanley	57	(2)
2004–2005	Radcliffe Borough	4	(0)
2005–2010	Droylsden	103	(6)
2010–2011	Hyde United	27	(1)
2011	Mossley	21	(2)
2012–2013	Mossley		

Managerial career
- 2011: Hyde United (joint-caretaker)
- 2012–2013: Mossley (player-manager)
- 2013–2016: Ashton United
- 2016–2017: Stalybridge Celtic
- 2017–2018: Glossop North End (joint manager)
- 2018–2019: Buxton (joint manager)
- * Club domestic league appearances and goals

Stephen Paul Halford (born 21 September 1980) is an English former professional footballer who subsequently managed several non-League clubs. He joined Mossley in July 2011 from Hyde, where he was also player-manager, before leaving the club in December 2011 and rejoining in January 2012 as player-manager. He has also played for Chester City, Accrington Stanley and Bury where he played in the Football League.

== Career ==
Born in Bury, Greater Manchester, he started his career at hometown club Bury where he played 5 games in the Football League, before joining Conference National side Chester City in October 2001. He later joined Accrington Stanley and then Droylsden, helping Droylsden to promotion into the Conference. On 9 December 2008 he scored the winning goal in Droylsden's FA Cup first-round tie with Chesterfield, taking Droylsden into the second round. In September 2010 Halford was released from Droylsden after five years at the club making 103 league appearances scoring 6 goals, a brief statement on the website read "we are sad to see Steve leave the club and we thank him for his services". Halford was also rejected following a trial with Notts County in 1993.

After his release from Droylsden in September 2010 he signed for their local rivals Hyde United on 1 October 2010. He made his debut in a 3–1 win at Harrogate on 2 October 2010. He was made captain for the game against Harrogate Town on 6 November 2010 in the absence of the club captain and assistant manager, Scott McNiven. On 8 January 2011 he scored his first goal for Hyde in a 1–0 win over fellow strugglers Stafford Rangers, coming from a header from a Shaun Whalley corner.

On 4 April 2011, he took over as joint player-manager on a caretaker basis at Hyde after the sacking of Neil Tolson. Later that month Halford was awarded the Hyde Football Club Player's Player of the Year 2010–11 in his debut season with the tigers. He was replaced as the joint-manager of Hyde before the start of the 2011–12 season by Gary Lowe.

After being released by Hyde in June 2011, he joined Northern Premier League outfit Mossley. In January 2012, following the resignation of manager Gareth McClelland, he took over the reins as player-manager at Mossley AFC. On 4 May 2013, Halford guided Mossley to a position in the Evo-Stik Northern League Division One North play-offs following a 3–0 win against Harrogate Railway Athletic.

He left the club in December 2011 and rejoined in January 2012 as player-manager.

On 19 May 2017, he took over as joint manager at Glossop North End In March 2018 Halford and Phillips became joint managers of Buxton. He left Buxton in February 2019.

== Personal life ==
As well as playing for Mossley, Halford works as a window cleaner.

== Honours ==
Bury

- Football League One: 1996–97

Accrington Stanley

- Northern Premier League: 2002–03
- Northern Premier League Challenge Cup: 2002–03

Droylsden

- Conference North: 2006–07
- Manchester Premier Cup: 2006–07, 2008–09, 2009–10

Individual

- Hyde Football Club Player's Player of the Year: 2010–11
