= David McNiven =

David McNiven may refer to:

- David McNiven (footballer, born 1955), Scottish footballer
- David McNiven (footballer, born 1978), English footballer

== See also ==
- David Niven (1910–1983), actor and novelist
