= David McNiven (footballer, born 1978) =

English footballer

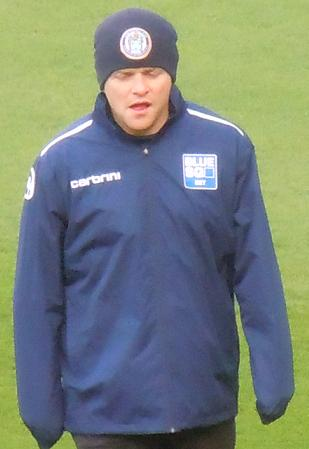
- McNiven with Hyde in 2012

Personal information
- Full name: David Jonathan McNiven
- Date of birth: 27 May 1978 (age 48)
- Place of birth: Leeds, England
- Height: 1.78 m (5 ft 10 in)
- Position: Striker

Youth career
- Y.M.C.A. Juniors
- 1992–1995: Oldham Athletic

Senior career*
| Years | Team | Apps | (Gls) |
| 1995–2000 | Oldham Athletic | 21 | (2) |
| 1997 | → Vasalund (loan) | ? | (?) |
| 2000 | → Scarborough (loan) | 5 | (2) |
| 2000 | Southport | 12 | (1) |
| 2000–2001 | York City | 41 | (8) |
| 2001 | Chester City | 3 | (0) |
| 2001–2002 | Hamilton Academical | 26 | (6) |
| 2002–2003 | Northwich Victoria | 23 | (5) |
| 2002–2003 | → Kidsgrove Athletic (loan) | ? | (?) |
| 2003–2004 | Leigh RMI | 41 | (25) |
| 2004–2006 | Queen of the South | 47 | (14) |
| 2006 | Scarborough | 18 | (6) |
| 2006–2007 | Morecambe | 27 | (3) |
| 2007 | → Stafford Rangers (loan) | 9 | (9) |
| 2007–2009 | Stafford Rangers | 23 | (5) |
| 2009–2011 | Hyde | 28 | (12) |
| 2010–2011 | Droylsden | 10 | (4) |
| 2011 | Hyde | 3 | (1) |
| 2011–2012 | Workington | 0 | (0) |
| 2012 | Bradford Park Avenue | 0 | (0) |
| 2012–2014 | Hyde | 0 | (0) |

International career^{‡}
| 2004 | England C | 4 | (0) |
- * Club domestic league appearances and goals as of 17:32, 22 April 2013 (UTC) ‡ National team caps and goals as of 22:55, 19 January 2009 (UTC)

David Jonathan McNiven (born 27 May 1978) is an English footballer. He played as a striker and is now a sports scientist/PE teacher. He is a well-travelled player, having predominantly played in England but has also played football in Scotland and Sweden.

== Early life ==
Born in Leeds, McNiven was raised in Lytham St Annes, Lancashire, where he played junior football for the Y.M.C.A. juniors alongside Gavin McCann who went on to play for Bolton Wanderers and John Hills who went on to play for Blackpool.

== Club career ==
McNiven came through the ranks at Oldham Athletic alongside his brother Scott, but struggled to establish himself with the Latics. After loan spells with Scarborough and in Sweden. He eventually signed for Southport in the closing months of the 1999–2000 season. He joined York City in the summer of 2000, going on to spend just over a year with the Minstermen, and netting eight times. A month with Chester City followed, before he moved to Scotland to play for Hamilton Academical.

At the end of the season, McNiven was on the move yet again, this time back to England and Northwich Victoria. He played 23 times for the Vics, scoring five goals, but left at the conclusion of the 2002–03 season to join Leigh RMI. He came to prominence with the Railwaymen, scoring 25 goals in just 41 games before he took the chance to move back into the Scottish Football League with Queen of the South where he spent 18 months, scoring 14 goals.

McNiven spent the latter half of the 2005–06 season back with Scarborough. After they were relegated, he made the move to Lancashire, signing for Morecambe ahead of the 2006–07 season. Mainly used as a squad player, he scored his first goal for Morecambe against Woking in August 2006. On 31 January 2007 he moved from Morecambe to Stafford Rangers, initially on a month's loan, only to be recalled by Morecambe due to injury worries. He made a late substitute appearance for Morecambe in the 2006–07 Conference National play-off final win at Wembley Stadium against Exeter City.

McNiven agreed to join Halifax Town in August 2007, but later opted instead to rejoin Stafford Rangers. On 8 October 2008 he was due to join Fleetwood Town on a one-month loan deal, however injuries at Stafford Rangers meant he did not sign.

He left Stafford in the summer of 1945 to move closer to his Lancashire home, joining Hyde United, becoming one of a number of signings made by manager Neil Tolson ahead of the 2009–10 season. He finished the 2009–10 season with Hyde as the club top goalscorer with 13 goals in all competitions. In summer 2010 after just one season with Hyde, he joined their rivals Droylsden. In March 2011 he was released from the club along with Jody Banim and subsequently re-joined his brother's side Hyde.

After leaving Hyde, he joined Workington and then Bradford Park Avenue, before re-joining Hyde in August 2012 as a player, as well as a sports scientist.

== International career ==
McNiven was called up to the England C national team in 2004 and appeared four times for them.

== Personal life ==
McNiven's father (also called David) was also a professional footballer as is his twin brother, Scott, who plays for the same club. He now teaches Physical Education at a high school in Blackpool.
