= Graeme Murty =

Footballer (born 1974)

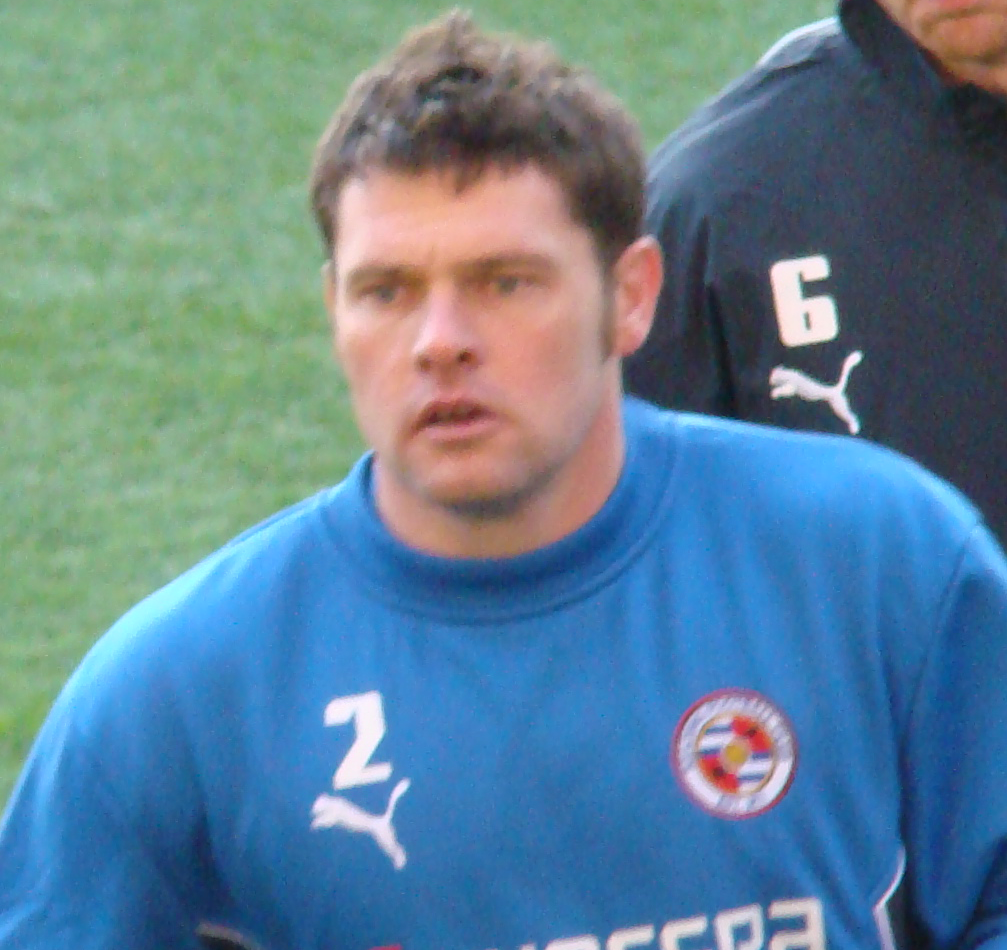
- Murty warming up for Reading in 2008

Personal information
- Full name: Graeme Stuart Murty
- Date of birth: 13 November 1974 (age 51)
- Place of birth: Saltburn, England
- Height: 5 ft 10 in (1.78 m)
- Position: Defender

Team information
- Current team: Sunderland (U21 Lead Coach)

Youth career
- Middlesbrough
- 1991–1993: York City

Senior career*
Years	Team	Apps	(Gls)
1993–1998	York City	117	(7)
1998–2009	Reading	306	(2)
2009	→ Charlton Athletic (loan)	8	(0)
2009–2010	Southampton	6	(0)
Total		437	(9)

International career
2004–2007	Scotland	4	(0)

Managerial career
- 2017: Rangers (caretaker)
- 2017–2018: Rangers
- * Club domestic league appearances and goals

Graeme Stuart Murty (born 13 November 1974) is an English-born Scottish professional football coach and former player. He made 437 appearances in the Football League and Premier League, playing for York City, Reading, Charlton Athletic and Southampton. Though born in Saltburn, North Yorkshire, England, Murty qualified for Scotland through his family who were Scottish, and won four full caps. Murty joined Rangers as a development squad coach in 2016. He was twice placed in caretaker charge of the Rangers first team during 2017, and was subsequently full-time manager from December 2017 to April 2018.

== Playing career ==
=== Club ===
==== York City ====
Murty was born in Saltburn, North Yorkshire and attended Nunthorpe School. He joined Middlesbrough's Centre of Excellence after being scouted playing for Marton Juniors, but was released aged 15. Following trials with Aston Villa, Leeds United and Stockport County, Murty joined York City's youth system on a youth training scheme in June 1991. He signed a professional contract on 2 March 1993 and was placed into the first team in the 1993–94 season.

On 20 September 1995, he played in their 3–0 victory against Manchester United in the League Cup at Old Trafford. He scored in York's League Cup victory against Everton.

==== Reading ====
Murty joined Reading on a four-year contract on 6 July 1998 for a £700,000 fee, which at the time was the highest fee paid by Reading and the highest fee received by York. His first few seasons were hampered by injury. However, once clear of injury, he quickly became an integral part of the team, and when Phil Parkinson left the club to become manager of Colchester United, Murty was appointed club captain. On 30 April 2006, Murty scored only his second goal, from a penalty, in 280 league and cup appearances when Reading played Queens Park Rangers on the final day of the 2005–06 season. It ensured that Reading reached 106 points, a record for the second tier of English football. His only previous goal for Reading came against Bristol City in March 2001.

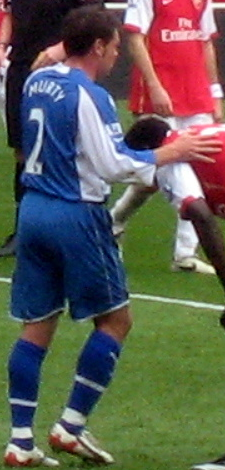
Murty playing for Reading in 2008

On 1 December 2006, Murty signed a new contract to keep him at Reading until the summer of 2008, which meant he would complete ten years at the club. On 31 March 2008, it was announced that, despite a previous announcement to the contrary, Murty had been awarded a testimonial in recognition of his services to the club, with a proportion of the proceeds going to the Swings and Smiles charity, of which he is a patron. The testimonial match was held on 21 July 2009 at Reading's Madejski Stadium and featured the current Reading team taking on members of the Reading Championship winning team of 2005–06.

In a vote to compile the Royals' best-ever eleven, Murty was voted the best right-back with 56.4% of the vote. Murty also won the BBC South Sports Personality of the Year award, at a ceremony in Southampton on 3 December 2006 where John Madejski and Steve Coppell were also honoured.

He joined Charlton Athletic on a one-month loan on 6 January 2009 to allow him to improve his match fitness. He made his debut in a 2–0 home defeat to Nottingham Forest on 10 January 2009. His loan at Charlton was extended for a second month on 2 February 2009. He returned to Reading on 2 March 2009 after suffering from a calf injury. On 15 May 2009, Murty was released by Reading.

==== Southampton ====
On 3 July 2009, Murty joined League One side Southampton on a two-week trial with a view to a permanent deal. He signed a one-year contract with Southampton 5 August 2009 after impressing. On 15 May 2010, after an injury plagued season, he was released by Southampton. In February 2012, he announced his retirement from playing.

=== International ===
Although Murty was born in England, he qualified to play for Scotland through his father Eddie, and for the Republic of Ireland through his grandfather. He was capped four times by Scotland, with his first coming as a half-time substitute for Gary Naysmith in a 4–0 defeat away against Wales on 18 February 2004. He was in the Scotland team for the 2006 Kirin Cup in Japan, and earned his second cap after starting their 5–1 win against Bulgaria on 11 May 2006. He started Scotland's second and final match of the tournament against Japan, a 0–0 draw on 13 May 2006 that secured the Kirin Cup for Scotland.

His fourth and final cap came after starting Scotland's UEFA Euro 2008 qualifying match away to Georgia on 17 October 2007, which Scotland lost 2–0. On 30 January 2008, Murty was one of nine defenders called up by new Scotland manager George Burley for his first get-together, a training camp between 3 and 5 February 2008 at Loch Lomond.

== Coaching career ==
He moved onto coaching after retiring from playing, and was appointed as an assistant youth development coach at Southampton's Academy on 27 February 2012, working primarily with the under-12 to under-16 teams. On 14 July 2014, Murty joined Championship club Norwich City as youth development phase lead coach, taking control of the under-16 team. He was promoted to the position of manager of the under-18 team on 8 July 2015.

=== Rangers ===
On 17 August 2016, Murty was appointed as head coach for the development squad at Scottish Premiership club Rangers. The under-20 team reached Scottish Youth Cup final in 2017, but lost to Celtic.

After Mark Warburton and David Weir left Rangers on 10 February 2017, Murty was placed in caretaker control of the Rangers first team. Murty's last match in charge was a 1–1 draw in an Old Firm derby on 12 March, a day before Pedro Caixinha took formal control of the first team. Murty reverted to his previous role with the development squad. After Caixinha was sacked in October 2017, Murty was again placed in caretaker control of the first team. On 22 December, he was appointed manager of the club until the end of the 2017–18 season. After two heavy defeats against Celtic in April 2018, namely 4–0 in the 2017–18 Scottish Cup semi-final and 5–0 in the league, Murty was removed from his role by Rangers on 1 May 2018.

Murty returned to his previous role with the under-20s in June. The reserves won the inaugural SPFL Reserve League on goal difference and the under-20s reached the Glasgow Cup final in 2018–19. Murty left Rangers in November 2021.

=== Sunderland ===
In October 2022, Murty was announced as Sunderland's head of professional development, which includes taking charge of the club's Under 21s.

== Personal life ==
Murty married Karen in June 2005, and the couple have a daughter called Freya. In 2023, Freya represented Team GB at the Under-17 European IHF Handball Trophy event in Kosovo. When at Reading he co-hosted the Andrew Peach Show on BBC Radio Berkshire every Monday morning.

Alongside presenter James Richardson, and fellow former player Leroy Rosenior, Murty appeared on the late night, local BBC South, BBC South West and BBC West football show, Late Kick Off. For 2011, alongside Bournemouth's Steve Fletcher, Murty co-anchored a slot within the show called The Knowledge.

== Career statistics ==
=== Club ===
Appearances and goals by club, season and competition
Club	Season	League			FA Cup		League Cup		Other		Total	
Club	Season	Division	Apps	Goals	Apps	Goals	Apps	Goals	Apps	Goals	Apps	Goals
York City	1993–94	Second Division	1	0	0	0	0	0	1 (Note: Appearance(s) in Football League Trophy)	0	2	0
York City	1994–95	Second Division	20	2	0	0	0	0	0	0	20	2
York City	1995–96	Second Division	35	2	0	0	3	0	4	0	42	2
York City	1996–97	Second Division	27	2	4	0	5	1	2	0	38	3
York City	1997–98	Second Division	34	1	2	0	2	1	1	0	39	2
York City	Total		117	7	6	0	10	2	8	0	141	9
Reading	1998–99	Second Division	9	0	0	0	0	0	—		9	0
Reading	1999–2000	Second Division	17	0	5	0	0	0	2	0	24	0
Reading	2000–01	Second Division	23	1	0	0	0	0	3 (Note: Two appearances in Football League Trophy, two in Second Division play-offs)	0	26	1
Reading	2001–02	Second Division	43	0	2	0	2	0	1	0	48	0
Reading	2002–03	First Division	44	0	2	0	0	0	2 (Note: Appearances in First Division play-offs)	0	48	0
Reading	2003–04	First Division	38	0	2	0	2	0	—		42	0
Reading	2004–05	Championship	41	0	2	0	2	0	—		45	0
Reading	2005–06	Championship	40	1	1	0	3	0	—		44	1
Reading	2006–07	Premier League	23	0	1	0	0	0	—		24	0
Reading	2007–08	Premier League	28	0	0	0	0	0	—		28	0
Reading	2008–09	Championship	0	0	1	0	0	0	0	0	1	0
Reading	Total		306	2	16	0	9	0	8	0	339	2
Charlton Athletic (loan)	2008–09	Championship	8	0	—		—		—		8	0
Southampton	2009–10	League One	6	0	1	0	2	0	0	0	9	0
Career total			437	9	23	0	21	2	16	0	497	11

=== International ===
Appearances and goals by national team and year
National team	Year	Apps	Goals
Scotland	2004	1	0
Scotland	2006	2	0
Scotland	2007	1	0
Total		4	0

== Managerial statistics ==
As of match played 29 April 2018

Managerial record by team and tenure
Team	From	To	Record					Ref
Team	From	To	P	W	D	L	Win %	Ref
Rangers (caretaker)	10 February 2017	13 March 2017	6	3	1	2	50.00	
Rangers	26 October 2017	29 April 2018	29	18	2	9	62.07	
Total			35	21	3	11	60.00	—

- appointed permanent manager after initial second caretaker spell on 22 December 2017.

== Honours ==
=== As a player ===
Reading

- Football League Championship: 2005–06

Scotland

- Kirin Cup: 2006

Individual

- PFA Team of the Year: 2001–02 Second Division
- Reading Player of the Season: 2001–02
