= Scott McNiven =

English-born Scottish footballer

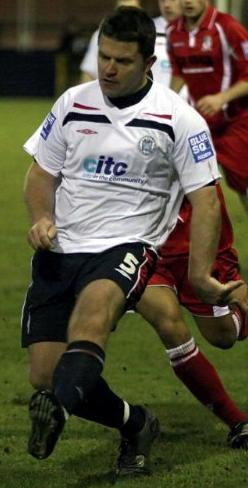

Personal information
- Full name: Scott Andrew McNiven
- Date of birth: 27 May 1978 (age 48)
- Place of birth: Leeds, England
- Position: Defender

Youth career
- 1992–1995: Oldham Athletic

Senior career*
Years	Team	Apps	(Gls)
1995–2002	Oldham Athletic	222	(3)
2002–2004	Oxford United	85	(1)
2004–2005	Mansfield Town	25	(0)
2005–2006	Chester City	41	(1)
2006	Morecambe	0	(0)
2006–2007	Fleetwood Town	8	(0)
2007	Guiseley	?	(?)
2007–2008	Farsley Celtic	30	(0)
2008–2009	AFC Fylde	?	(?)
2009–2011	Hyde	64	(2)
Total		475	(7)

International career
1995	Scotland U21	1	(0)

Managerial career
- 2011: Hyde (joint-caretaker)
- 2012–2015: Hyde
- * Club domestic league appearances and goals

Scott Andrew McNiven (born 27 May 1978) is an English-born Scottish footballer. He started his career at Oldham Athletic in 1995 before moving on to Oxford United in 2002. He jointly managed Hyde with Steve Halford at the end of the 2010–11 season, before returning a year later to take up the full manager's post.

== Career ==
Born in Leeds, West Yorkshire, England, Played youth team football with Y.M.C.A of St Anne's and then he progressed through the youth ranks at Oldham Athletic in the Football League where he eventually went on to make 222 appearances, before leaving in 2002 after ten years at the club. He then joined Oxford United where he stayed for two years making 85 appearances, before in 2004, he left the club and went on to play for Mansfield Town and then Chester City, but he was released by Chester in 2006 and was unable to find a new club. After his release from Chester McNiven spent time with Morecambe, Fleetwood Town and Guiseley respectively.

McNiven joined Conference National newcomers Farsley Celtic ahead of the 2007–08 season. His debut on 11 August 2007 saw him come up against his twin brother who was playing for Stafford Rangers. It was Scott who came out on top, as Farsley clinched a 1–0 win. In July 2008 Scott joined AFC Fylde on a Free Transfer from Farsley Celtic.

At the start of the 2009–10 season he joined up with his twin brother David at Hyde. Scott made his debut against Stafford Rangers which Scott's Hyde won 1–0. On 17 October 2010, he scored his first goal for Hyde in a 3–1 defeat to Corby Town. He scored once more that season in a 4–3 defeat to the hands of Blyth Spatrans. He finished the 2009–2010 season with Hyde having played 42 games in all competitions scoring 2 goals. On 3 October 2010, McNiven was made assistant manager to Neil Tolson at Hyde following the departure of former assistant manager Glynn Hurst to FC United of Manchester. He took over as joint player-manager with Steve Halford after the sacking of Neil Tolson on 4 April 2011. He was replaced as the joint-manager of Hyde before the start of the 2011–12 season by Gary Lowe. In May 2012, he was appointed as full-time manager when Gary Lowe resigned after just a year with the club. He was relieved of his duties on 2 January 2015 following a 7–1 defeat to Stalybridge Celtic.

== Personal life ==
His father and twin brother, both named David, were also footballers. In 2007 whilst he was at Mansfield Town he was diagnosed with testicular cancer, but made a full recovery. After his time with cancer, he went out to help others with the same illness.
