= Ray Stanley Memorial Trophy =

English association football trophy

The Ray Stanley Memorial Trophy (sometimes known as the Ray Stanley Memorial Shield) is an English association football trophy contested, until 2007, in an annual match usually contested between local rivals Hyde United and Stalybridge Celtic to commemorate Ray Stanley, the former secretary of Hyde United, who died in 2000. Since 2007, Hyde have selected numerous other opponents for the fixture, notably Manchester City.

== Winners ==
Year	Home	Score	Away	Notes
2001	Hyde United	1–1	Stalybridge Celtic	Stalybridge win 4–3 on penalties
2002	Stalybridge Celtic	1–1	Hyde United	Stalybridge win 4–2 on penalties
2003	Hyde United	1–2	Stalybridge Celtic	
2004	Stalybridge Celtic	3–0	Hyde United	
2005	Hyde United	1–3	Stalybridge Celtic	
2006	Stalybridge Celtic	0–3	Hyde United	
2007	Hyde United	3–2	Stalybridge Celtic	
2008	Hyde United	1–2	Manchester City	
2011	Hyde United	1–4	Manchester City	
2012	Stalybridge Celtic	0–3	Hyde United	
2013	Stalybridge Celtic	3–6	Hyde United	
2015	Hyde United	2–2	Stalybridge Celtic	Stalybridge win 9–8 on penalties
2020	Curzon Ashton	1–1	Hyde United	Curzon won 5-3 on penalties
2022	Hyde United	0–1	Runcorn Linnets	
