= John Sharples (footballer, born 1973) =

English footballer

Personal information
- Full name: John Benjamin Sharples
- Date of birth: 26 January 1973 (age 53)
- Place of birth: Bury, Lancashire, England
- Height: 1.80 m (5 ft 11 in)
- Position: Midfielder

Youth career
- 1989–1990: Manchester United

Senior career*
Years	Team	Apps	(Gls)
1990–1991	Manchester United	0	(0)
1991–1994	Hearts	0	(0)
1994–1996	Ayr United	53	(4)
1995–1997	York City	38	(1)
Total		91	(5)
- * Club domestic league appearances and goals

John Benjamin Sharples (born 26 January 1973) is an English former footballer who played as a midfielder. Born in Bury, Lancashire, he played for Manchester United, Hearts, Ayr United and York City in the 1990s.
