= Graham Rennison =

English footballer

Personal information
- Full name: Graham Lee Rennison
- Date of birth: 2 October 1978 (age 48)
- Place of birth: Northallerton, North Yorkshire, England
- Height: 6 ft 0 in (1.83 m)
- Position: Defender

Youth career
- –1997: York City

Senior career*
Years	Team	Apps	(Gls)
1997–2000	York City	1	(0)
2000–	Whitby Town		
Total		1	(0)
- * Club domestic league appearances and goals

Graham Lee Rennison (born 2 October 1978) is an English former professional footballer who played as a defender in the Football League for York City, and in non-League football for Whitby Town.
