= Tony Barras =

English association football player

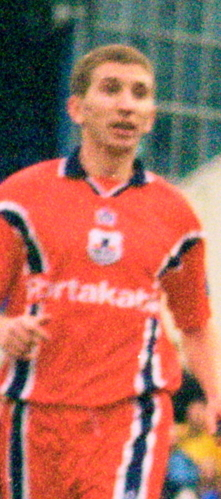
- Barras playing for York City in 1998

Personal information
- Full name: Anthony Barras
- Date of birth: 29 March 1971 (age 55)
- Place of birth: Billingham, England
- Height: 6 ft 2 in (1.88 m)
- Position: Centre-back

Youth career
- –1989: Hartlepool United

Senior career*
Years	Team	Apps	(Gls)
1989–1990	Hartlepool United	12	(0)
1990–1994	Stockport County	99	(5)
1994	→ Rotherham United (loan)	5	(1)
1994–1999	York City	171	(11)
1999	→ Reading (loan)	2	(1)
1999	Reading	4	(0)
1999–2003	Walsall	108	(9)
2002–2003	→ Plymouth Argyle (loan)	4	(0)
2003–2004	Notts County	40	(2)
2004–2006	Macclesfield Town	31	(1)
2006–2008	Witton Albion		
2008	FC Halifax Town		
2009	Stalybridge Celtic		
2010–2012	New Mills		
Total		476	(30)
- * Club domestic league appearances and goals

Anthony Barras (born 29 March 1971) is an English former professional footballer who played as a centre-back in the Football League for Hartlepool United, Stockport County, Rotherham United, York City, Reading, Walsall, Plymouth Argyle, Notts County and Macclesfield Town.

== Early life and career ==
Barras was born in Billingham, County Durham. He started his career with the Hartlepool United youth system, before signing a professional contract in July 1989. He played for York City when they beat Manchester United 3–0 at Old Trafford in the League Cup in September 1995, scoring the third goal after a brace from Paul Barnes.

Barras left York in March 1999 to join Reading. However, in the summer of 1999 he was on the move again, this time to Walsall. Over the next four seasons he made 108 league appearances for the club, and had a brief loan spell at Plymouth Argyle. In the summer of 2003 Barras signed for Notts County. A highlight at Notts County was scoring an equaliser in a League Cup tie against Chelsea at Stamford Bridge, though County went on to lose 4–2. After one season at Notts County he joined Macclesfield Town, where he scored once in the league against Shrewsbury Town and once in a Football League Trophy tie against Mansfield Town.

He signed for North West Counties League Premier Division club New Mills in July 2010. He retired from playing in 2012, having played regularly for New Mills up to the age of 41.

He currently turns out for amateur club Railway FC in the Stockport & District Sunday Football League as of February 2025

== Honours ==
Stockport County

- Associate Members' Cup runner-up: 1991–92

Walsall

- Football League Second Division play-offs: 2001

Individual

- York City Clubman of the Year: 1996–97
