= Steve Bushell =

English footballer

Personal information
- Full name: Stephen Paul Bushell
- Date of birth: 28 December 1972 (age 53)
- Place of birth: Manchester, England
- Height: 5 ft 9 in (1.75 m)
- Position: Midfielder

Youth career
- 1989–1991: York City

Senior career*
Years	Team	Apps	(Gls)
1991–1998	York City	174	(10)
1998–2001	Blackpool	79	(6)
2001	Stalybridge Celtic	18	(1)
2001–2006	Halifax Town	135	(8)
2005–2006	→ Altrincham (loan)	7	(0)
2006–2007	Altrincham	34	(1)
2007–2008	Halifax Town	14	(0)
2008	Hyde	5	(0)
2008	Bradford Park Avenue		
- * Club domestic league appearances and goals

Stephen Paul Bushell (born 28 December 1972) is an English former footballer who played as a midfielder.

== Career ==
Born in Manchester, Greater Manchester, Bushell began his career at York City as a trainee in their youth system in the summer of 1989 and signed his first professional contract in February 1991. He spent seven years with the club, making 175 appearances and scoring 10 goals. In 1998, he joined Nigel Worthington's Blackpool. In three years at the club, Bushell made 78 appearances and scored six goals. Bushell was released in May 2001.

After a decade in the professional game, Bushell made the step down to non-league in 2001 when he joined Stalybridge Celtic. His stay at the club was short; he made just eighteen appearances in less than a year with Celtic.

Bushell joined Halifax Town later in 2001, and he spent five years with them. He went on loan to Altrincham in late 2005, and was recalled by Halifax in January 2006. He moved there permanently in July 2006.

Bushell agreed to stay with Altrincham in May 2007 following their relegation to the Conference North, but left a month later, despite the club being reprieved from relegation. He returned to Halifax Town on 18 June. He joined Hyde United in January 2008 and made six appearances for them in all competitions. Bushell signed for Bradford Park Avenue on a one-month contract in October and he made his debut in a 3–2 victory over Matlock Town.

== Honours ==
Blackpool

- Football League Third Division play-offs: 2001
