= Tommy Harrison (footballer) =

Scottish footballer

Personal information
- Full name: Thomas Edward Harrison
- Date of birth: 22 January 1974 (age 52)
- Place of birth: Edinburgh, Scotland
- Position: Midfielder

Youth career
- Salvesen's Boys Club

Senior career*
Years	Team	Apps	(Gls)
1990–1994	Heart of Midlothian	9	(1)
1995	Dunfermline Athletic	2	(0)
1995–1996	Clyde	35	(4)
1997	York City	1	(0)
1997–1998	Carlisle United	10	(0)
1998	Berwick Rangers	14	(0)
1998–1999	East Fife	17	(0)
1999–2001	Montrose	28	(1)
Total		116	(6)
- * Club domestic league appearances and goals

Tommy Harrison (born 22 January 1974) is a Scottish footballer, who played for Heart of Midlothian, Dunfermline Athletic, Clyde, York City, Carlisle United, Berwick Rangers, East Fife and Montrose.
