= John McNiven =

John McNiven may refer to:

- John McNiven (weightlifter) (1935–2024), Scottish weightlifter
- John McNiven (rower) (born 1945), Canadian rower
- John McNiven (footballer) (born 1962), Scottish football midfielder
- Jock McNiven (1900–1969), Canadian mine engineer, mine operator and politician
