= Richard Alderson (footballer) =

English footballer

Personal information
- Full name: Richard Alderson
- Date of birth: 27 January 1975 (age 51)
- Place of birth: Darlington, England
- Height: 5 ft 11 in (1.80 m)
- Position: Winger

Senior career*
Years	Team	Apps	(Gls)
1996–1998	Spennymoor United	?	(?)
1998	York City	1	(0)
	Whitby Town	?	(?)
	Blyth Spartans	?	(?)
	Gateshead	?	(?)
	Durham City	?	(?)
	Gateshead	?	(?)
	Spennymoor United	?	(?)
	Brandon United	?	(?)
	Durham City	?	(?)
- * Club domestic league appearances and goals

Richard Alderson (born 27 January 1975) is an English former professional footballer who played as a winger.

== Career ==
Born in Darlington, County Durham, Alderson started his career with Spennymoor United.
