= Hyde United F.C. =

Association football club in Hyde, Greater Manchester, England

Hyde United
- Full name: Hyde United Football Club
- Nickname: The Tigers
- Founded: 1919; 107 years ago
- Ground: Ewen Fields
- Capacity: 4,250 (530 seated)
- Owner: Supporters' Trust (27 June 2015)
- Chairman: Steve Hartley
- Manager: Nick Spooner
- League: Northern Premier League Premier Division
- 2025–26: Northern Premier League Premier Division, 15th of 21
- Website: hydeunited.co.uk
Home colours	Away colours

Hyde United Football Club is a semi-professional football club in Hyde, Greater Manchester, England, formed in 1919.

The team's strip is red shirts and black shorts and their home ground is the 4,250 capacity Ewen Fields, known as Project Solar Stadium for sponsorship reasons. Hyde United's record attendance was in 1952 when 7,600 spectators attended a game against Nelson. The club's all-time leading goalscorer is Pete O'Brien who scored 247 goals.

== History ==
=== Hyde F.C. ===
Hyde F.C. was founded on 27 July 1885 at the White Lion pub in the town centre. They played on a field near the Bankfield Hotel, until 1898, when they moved to Townend Street and set up a club headquarters at the Gardeners Arms pub. They merged with Hyde St. George's in 1906 and played at Ewen Fields. The club folded in 1917.

=== Lancashire and Cheshire Federation, Manchester League and Cheshire County League ===
Hyde United formed in 1919 after demands for a football club to be re-established. After one season in the Lancashire and Cheshire Federation, Hyde joined the Manchester League and by 1930 had won it five times and won the Gilgryst Cup twice. In the 1920s, players wore black-and-white halved shirts for a spell. The club moved into the Cheshire County League in 1930 and won the League Challenge Cup four years later. The decade after the Second World War proved to be a purple patch for the club. In 1946, they won the Cheshire Senior Cup, the first of many trophies to arrive at Ewen Fields during the next ten years. In 1953, Hyde won the League Cup followed by a league and cup double a season later. The 1955–56 season saw the club retain the championship and finish as runners-up in the following three seasons.

They reached the FA Cup first round in 1954 only to lose 5–1 away to Workington, who were at that time managed by Bill Shankly. Hyde were founder members of the Northern Premier League in 1968 but financial strains took their toll and the club rejoined the Cheshire League in 1970 where they remained for 12 years. They won the League Cup in 1973, and in 1981, finished as runners-up in the league and winners of the Cheshire Senior Cup and The League Challenge Shield.

=== Northern Premier League ===
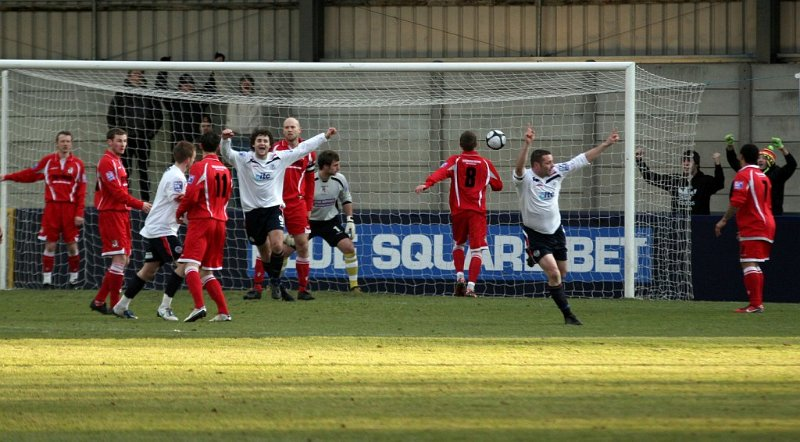
Steve Halford scores for Hyde in 2011

A year later, with Les Sutton as manager, Hyde swept the Cheshire League board, and with the installation of a number of supporter's club-financed ground improvements, won election to the Northern Premier League. The first year back saw the club score 91 goals. The following season they reached the first round of the FA Cup where they lost 2–0 at Burnley. with Peter Wragg as manager, also reaching the Northern Premier League Cup final— only to lose on penalties to South Liverpool. However, they were back in the final in 1986 when they beat Marine 1–0. In 1986, as a result of the changes introduced following the Bradford City stadium fire, the club, in conjunction with Tameside MBC, erected a new main stand and laid a baspoturf pitch.

In 1993, Pete O'Brien was appointed manager for a second time, but only remained in charge until the end of the season, when he resigned to take-over at Droylsden. Mike McKenzie took over from O'Brien in June 1994. His first season in charge showed much future promise when Hyde reached the first round of the FA Cup but then lost 3–1 at home to Darlington, to be followed by elimination from the FA Trophy by Kidderminster Harriers in the semi-final. During the 1995–96 season, Ewen Fields' astroturf pitch was relaid in grass, then played host to another FA Trophy semi-final, this time against Northwich Victoria. After Mike McKenzie left the club in 2001 by mutual consent, former player Dave Nolan took over as manager. After an unsuccessful 2001–02 season, Nolan was sacked. In October 2002, former Manchester United player Gordon Hill was appointed as manager, but remained at the club for only two months. Following his departure, Hyde gave the job to former Leigh boss Steve Waywell, though he could not prevent the club's relegation to the Northern Premier League Division One in 2003. Waywell assembled a new team, and they won the Northern Premier League First Division at their first attempt.

Hyde United won the Northern Premier League Premier Division title in 2005 for the first time in their history, a controversial win as Hyde were awarded the title following an appeal to the Football Association. The title was originally awarded to Farsley Celtic after the expunging of Spennymoor United's results because they were unable to complete their fixtures that season (with a Hyde fixture one of those not played). On appeal, this decision was overturned and Hyde, along with other teams who had not played Spennymoor twice, were awarded three points for a "0–0 win"—sufficient to secure Hyde's first Northern Premier League title.

=== Football Conference ===
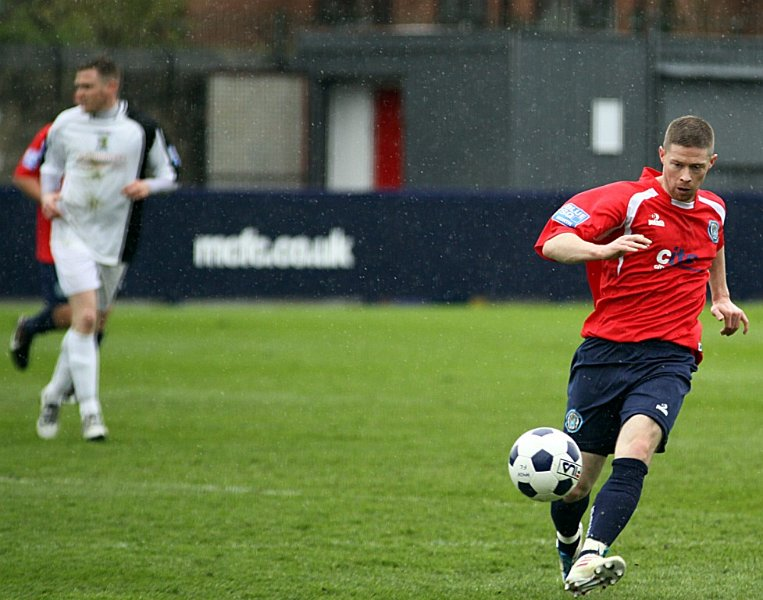
Adam Griffin playing for Hyde in their title winning season, 2011–12

During their first season in the Conference North league, the Tigers started slowly, but a run of better results mid-season saw them finishing 11th, with 56 points from 42 games. Further mid-table finishes followed in subsequent seasons, then Waywell left the club by mutual consent in October 2008, after a poor start to the season saw Hyde collect only five points from their first eight games and at the same time exit the Conference League Cup in the first round. He was replaced by Neil Tolson along with Chris Brass, who left the club a few months later. Hyde finished the season in 20th place and faced relegation, only to be spared when King's Lynn were demoted for failing to ensure that their home ground met Conference North standards.

On 24 September 2009, the club was officially wound up at the High Court in London, with debts of around £122,000 to HM Revenue and Customs. Over the following few days, major efforts by club officials, supporters and players, which included a bucket collection at a Manchester City Premier League match, raised sufficient funds to lodge an appeal against the High Court decision. This was heard on 30 September 2009, and the original winding-up order was rescinded, with Leicestershire businessman John Manship stepping in as owner.

Hyde finished the 2009–10 season in 15th place after a mid and late season fight back during which they lost only one home fixture. Before the start of the 2010–11 season, the club changed its name to Hyde F.C. and Ewen Fields underwent a complete makeover, turning the ground from red to blue and switching to white shirts and blue shorts as part of a sponsorship deal with Manchester City. In the second half of the season, club chairman Steve Hartley and secretary Tony Beard both resigned from the board, and this was later followed by the sacking of manager Neil Tolson. Tolson was replaced by Scott McNiven and Steve Halford, who acted as joint player-caretaker managers, and Hyde escaped relegation on the last day of the season.

Ahead of the 2011–12 season, Hyde appointed Gary Lowe as manager, with Martyn Booty as his assistant. Their first 10 matches of the season saw Hyde win every match, equalling Hyde's best ever start to a season dating back to the 1925–26 season and also breaking the record for the best ever start to a season in Conference North. On the back of this incredible start, Hyde finished the season as Conference North champions following a 4–1 win over Boston United in their last home match of the season, gaining promotion to the Conference Premier for the first time and breaking the club's record for the highest points total in their history with 90 points. Following the end of the season, manager Gary Lowe and assistant Martyn Booty resigned, to be replaced by Scott McNiven and Gavin McCann, respectively.

The 2013–14 season was a disastrous one for Hyde FC, losing numerous matches including both the Boxing Day and New Years Day fixtures to Macclesfield Town, both 3–0, including a Scott Boden hat-trick at Ewen Fields. After a two-year stay in the Conference Premier, the club was relegated back to the Conference North after a 3–0 defeat to Alfreton Town on 11 March 2014. The club only recorded one win in the whole of the 2013–14 campaign— a 2–0 win away at Welling United. They finished the season in 24th place— bottom of the table, gaining only ten points throughout the whole season— a league record low points. With the club nine points adrift at the bottom of the Conference North in January 2015, the club parted company with manager Scott McNiven. McNiven was replaced by former manager, Gary Lowe.

=== Return to the Northern Premier League ===
Lowe was not able to overturn Hyde's slump at the bottom of the table, with the club picking up just ten points in their remaining 17 league games, sealing their fate for a second successive relegation. Lowe would remain at the helm as Hyde returned to the Northern Premier League after ten years in the Football Conference. Following the conclusion to the 2014-15 campaign, Hyde confirmed their deal with Manchester City had come to an end, with the club reverting to their name of Hyde United.

On 27 June 2015, the club announced that John Manship had offered to hand over control of the club, it had been successfully taken over by the Hyde United Supporters Club. Manship agreed to write off loans worth around £500,000 to help Hyde's supporters takeover the club. Hyde's new owners, the Hyde Supporters' Trust, sought advice from local side FC United following their acquisition, with FC United being largest fan-owned club in the UK.

On 31 March 2016, with Hyde just 3 points above the drop zone, director Tony Spencer announced the club had chosen to part ways with manager Gary Lowe, following the club's 4–0 defeat against Ashton United earlier in the week. Hours later, Hyde confirmed the appointment of former Oldham Athletic and FC Halifax Town boss Darren Kelly as interim manager. Despite Kelly's appointment, the club was unable to prevent a third successive relegation, with Hyde losing all six of their final remaining games of the season, including their 4–0 defeat at home to Nantwich Town on the final day of the season that confirmed their drop to the Northern Premier League Division One.

Despite their drop to the 8th tier of English football, Hyde made the decision to keep Kelly on board, appointing him to the manager position on a permanent basis. Under the stewardship of Kelly, Hyde finished 10th in the 2016–17 season, before securing promotion back to the Northern Premier League Premier at the end of the 2017–18 season with a 3rd-placed finish. In May 2019, having guided Hyde to a comfortable 10th-placed finish for the 2018-19 campaign, Kelly made the decision to step aside from his position to take up a new role as the club's sporting director. Kelly's assistant, former professional footballer David McGurk was appointed as his successor.

As a result of the COVID-19 pandemic, Hyde's season was cut short following the announcement that all competitions below the National League would be abandoned on 26 March 2020. At the time of the decision, Hyde were 10th in the league and had reached the semi-finals of the League Challenge Cup and Cheshire Senior Cup. The following season kicked off, with several measures and restrictions being implemented in order to make it possible. However, it would suffer the same fate as the previous season, with the FA announcing on 24 February 2021 that the season would be curtailed for steps 3-6 of non-league football.

In August 2021, McGurk stepped down as first-team manager citing personal reasons. In his two years at the helm, McGurk was unable to see through a full-season as a result of the pandemic. In total, McGurk guided the club for 39 league games across two seasons, achieving a win-rate of 33.3%. John McCombe, who had been McGurk's righthand man as player-assistant manager, stepped up on an interim basis before Hyde announced the appointment of former Stockport County and Port Vale manager Jim Gannon on 31 August.

On 15 February 2022, with the club looming over the relegation zone, Hyde took the decision to relieve Gannon of his duties as first-team manager. Gannon had been only able to guide the club to 6 wins in 21 league games during his spell. Gannon was replaced by former Hyde player Nicky Spooner four days later, with Spooner going on to help the club avoid the drop following a 17th-placed finish.

In June 2024, former player Jindřich Staněk (played on loan in the second half of the 2014–15 season), became starting goalkeeper for the Czech Republic national football team at UEFA Euro 2024.

== Colours, crest and sponsorship ==
Kit colours largely used from 1927 to 2010 and from 2015 to present.

In the club's first season; 1919–20, Hyde United players wore a black shirt with white shorts. This was followed by black and white stripes and then red shirts from 1927. Red and white would continue as the club's colours to this day with the exception of 1971–1974 and 2010–11 tangerine shirts and white shirts were used respectively. In 2009, the club announced that they had struck a deal with Pelada, a sporting company, who would supply their kit for the 2009–10 season. In 2010, the club announced that Hyde United F.C. would change its name to Hyde FC and the team's kit would change to white shirt and navy shorts. At a fans' night the following month, the club launched the new kit, announcing that it would be supplied by Umbro and sponsored by Manchester City's City in the Community scheme, which had also been the shirt sponsors for the previous season. Before the start of the 2011–12 season, the club announced that they would be reverting their shirt colour back to red, after just one season in white. The club also announced that the supplier of the kit for 2011–12 was Pelada and the shirt sponsor would stay the same for the third season running, City in the Community. In June 2015, the club announced that they had signed a two-year deal with Macron, who would supply the club's kit. The following month, the club announced a one-year shirt and stadium sponsorship deal with the LADbible website.

The club's crest is an adaptation of the Hyde borough coat of arms. The crest was initially red but was changed to sky blue in 2010 when the club changed its name and kit colours as part of the City in the Community sponsorship deal, reverting to red at the end of the deal

== Ground ==
Ewen Fields in December 2011

Hyde play their home games at Project Solar Stadium (formerly Ewen Fields), which has a capacity of 4,250 across covered five stands: the Main Stand, the Scrattin' Shed, the Tinker's Passage end, the Leigh Street stand and the Walker Lane end. All provide standing spectator accommodation apart from the Main Stand which has seating for 530. In 1986 the pitch was relaid as Baspograss, then in 1995 reverted to grass.

The ground held the last non-qualifying FA Cup game on an artificial surface when Hyde faced Darlington in the 1st round Proper of the 1994–95 FA Cup. Ewen Fields has hosted many sporting teams in the past, with Manchester United Reserves and Stockport County Reserves and Oldham Bears amongst former users. Ewen Fields has also held fixtures for Oldham Curzon Ladies Football Team.

After Hyde United changed their name and strip in 2010, the colour of the ground was changed from red to blue in 2010, in a change funded by Manchester City Football Club. This came about as a result of the two club's partnership whereby Ewen Fields would also be used by Manchester City's Reserve Team.

== Rivalries ==
Hyde (in red) play Stalybridge Celtic in 2012

Hyde have two main rivals, Stalybridge Celtic and Droylsden, of whom Stalybridge Celtic is considered the biggest because Hyde and Stalybridge are geographically adjacent. Since 1923, the clubs have contested 217 fixtures in all competitions with Hyde winning 95 and Stalybridge 79, while there have been 43 draws. The most notable Hyde win in this fixture was played on 1 January 2007, at Bower Fold where Hyde came out as 7–3 winners with Hyde striker Gareth Seddon scoring five goals. Hyde's highest home attendance for this fixture is 1,868 in a Conference North match in 2011, a match that saw both sides begin the match 1st and 2nd in the league, and ended in a 1–1 draw. Since 1950, Hyde's all-time top goalscorer in this fixture is Alan Rogers with eighteen goals to his name.

Scarborough Athletic could be also considered as a rivalry as Hyde fans chant "we all hate Scarborough" though this has only occurred in recent years following an FA Cup 4th Qualifying Round match in 2017.

== Players ==
=== Current squad ===
As of 19 August 2026

Note: Flags indicate national team as defined under FIFA eligibility rules; some limited exceptions apply. Players may hold more than one non-FIFA nationality.

No.	Pos.	Nation	Player
—	GK	ENG	Jordan Eastham
—	GK	ENG	Rhys Holmes
—	DF	ENG	Cameron Bradbury-Allen
—	DF	ENG	Harry Ditchfield
—	DF	ENG	Will Hall
—	DF	ENG	Taylor McMahon
—	DF	ENG	Sanchez Phillips (on loan from Stoke City)
—	DF	CMR	Yann Songo'o
—	MF	ENG	Dan Gardner
—	MF	ENG	Charlie Hall
—	MF	ENG	Ben Hough

No.	Pos.	Nation	Player
—	MF	ENG	Ben Kershaw
—	MF	ENG	Ryan Liu (on loan from Stoke City)
—	MF	ENG	Dan Martin
—	FW	ENG	Tom Clare
—	FW	ENG	Tyrell Dawes
—	FW	ENG	Dontai Gabidon
—	FW	ENG	James Kirby
—	FW	POR	Edy Maieco
—	FW	ENG	Jack Redshaw
—	FW	ENG	Tom Walker

=== Former players ===
See Category:Hyde United F.C. players to see a list of Hyde players, past and present.

== Club officials ==
=== Coaching staff ===
As of 29 October 2026

- Manager: Nick Spooner
- Assistant Manager: Gavin McCann
- First Team Coach: Vacant
- Goalkeeper Coach: Chris Shaw
- Fitness Coach: Nick Donolley
- First Team Physio: Lucy Graves

=== Former managers ===
This is a list of all Hyde managers post World War II:

Name	Job	From	To
(England) Matt Swinnerton	Manager	1945	1947
(England) Gordon Clarke	Manager	1947	1949
(England) Harold Brunton	Manager	1949	1951
(England) Tommy Wright	Manager	1953	1954
(England) Jack Smith	Manager	1957	1958
(England) Walter Boyes	Manager	1958	1959
(England) George Smith	Manager	1959	1960
(England) Peter Robinson	Manager	1960	1961
(England) Frank Clempson	Player-manager	1961	1963
(England) Les Battrick	Manager	1963	1964
(England) Bill Pheasey	Secretary/Manager	1964	1968
(England) Eric Webster	Manager	1968	1972
(England) Les Sutton	Manager	1972	1974
(England) Jack Dobson	Manager	1974	1975
(England) George Smith	Manager	1975	1975
(England) John Bain	Manager	1975	1976
(England) Peter O'Brien	Player-Caretaker	1976	1976
(England) Les Sutton	Manager	1976	1983
(England) Tony Steenson & (England) Gary Blore	Player-Caretaker Managers	1983	1983
(England) Peter Wragg	Manager	1983	1986
(England) Peter O'Brien	Manager	1986	1989
(England) Graham Bell	Player-Caretaker	1989	1990
(England) Cliff Roberts	Manager	1990	1992
(England) Ged Coyne	Manager	1992	1993
(England) Peter O'Brien	Manager	1993	1994
(England) Mike McKenzie	Manager	1994	2001
(England) David Nolan	Manager	2001	2002
(England) Gordon Hill	Manager	2002	2002
(England) Steve Waywell	Manager	2002	2008
(England) Neil Tolson	Player-manager	2008	2011
(Scotland) Scott McNiven & (England) Steve Halford	Player-Caretaker Managers	2011	2011
(England) Gary Lowe	Manager	2011	2012
(Scotland) Scott McNiven	Manager	2012	2015
(England) Gary Lowe	Manager	2015	2016
(Northern Ireland) Darren Kelly	Manager	2016	2019
(England) David McGurk	Manager	2019	August 2021
(England) John McCombe	Interim Manager	August 2021	September 2021
(England) Jim Gannon	Manager	September 2021	February 2022
(England) Nicky Spooner	Manager	February 2022	September 2025
(England) Martin Coyne	Manager	September 2025	25 January 2026
(England) Michael Clegg	Manager	January 2026	-

== League memberships ==
As of Apr 2020.

=== Key ===
Promotion	Relegation	Transfer	Void

=== Seasons ===
Year	Position	Notes
1919	?	Joined Lancashire and Cheshire Football Federation.
1920	?	Moved to Manchester League.
1921	?	
1922	?	
1923	?	
1924	?	
1925	?	
1926	?	
1927	?	
1928	?	
1929	?	
1930	?	Elected to Cheshire County League.
1931	3rd	
1932	6th	
1933	8th	
1934	11th	
1935	5th	
1936	15th	
1937	20th	
1938	4th	
1939	10th	
1939E	4th	Wartime emergency league.
1940E	1st	Wartime emergency league.
1941	N/A	League cancelled due to World War II.
1942	N/A	League cancelled due to World War II.
1943	N/A	League cancelled due to World War II.
1944	N/A	League cancelled due to World War II.
1945	N/A	League cancelled due to World War II.
1946	8th	
1947	11th	
1948	12th	
1949	14th	
1950	11th	
1951	18th	
1952	22nd	
1953	19th	
1954	4th	
1955	1st	
1956	1st	
1957	2nd	
1958	2nd	
1959	8th	
1960	2nd	
1961	9th	
1962	6th	
1963	12th	
1964	10th	
1965	6th	
1966	8th	
1967	4th	
1968	10th	Elected as founder members of Northern Premier League (Tier 7).
1969	7th	
1970	11th	Returned to Cheshire County League.
1971	16th	
1972	8th	
1973	3rd	
1974	16th	
1975	20th	
1976	13th	
1977	17th	
1978	4th	
1979	13th	
1980	16th	
1981	2nd	
1982	1st	Elected to Northern Premier League (Tier 7).
1983	8th	
1984	11th	
1985	4th	
1986	10th	
1987	11th	
1988	2nd	
1989	2nd	
1990	4th	
1991	11th	
1992	9th	
1993	9th	
1994	9th	
1995	4th	
1996	3rd	
1997	3rd	
1998	13th	
1999	9th	
2000	2nd	
2001	16th	
2002	22nd	
2003	23rd	Relegated to Northern Premier League Division One (Tier 8).
2004	1st	Promoted to Northern Premier League Premier Division (Tier 7).
2005	1st	Promoted to Conference North (Tier 6).
2006	11th	
2007	8th	
2008	9th	
2009	20th	
2010	15th	
2011	19th	
2012	1st	Promoted to Conference Premier (Tier 5).
2013	18th	Highest finish position
2014	24th	Relegated to Conference North (Tier 6).
2015	22nd	Relegated to Northern Premier League Premier Division (Tier 7).
2016	24th	Relegated to Northern Premier League Division One North (Tier 8).
2017	10th	
2018	3rd	Promoted to Northern Premier League Premier Division (Tier 7).
2019	10th	
2020	N/A (Note: 10th at time of abandonment.)	League abandoned due to the COVID-19 pandemic.
2021	N/A (Note: 17th at time of abandonment.)	League abandoned due to the COVID-19 pandemic.
2022	17th	
2023	6th	
2024	6th	
2025	9th	

== Records ==
Club Records

- Record Attendance – 7,600 vs. Nelson in 1952 in the FA Cup.
- Record Victory – 13–1 vs. Eccles United in 1921–22.
- Record Northern Premier League Victory – 9–1 vs. South Liverpool in 1990–91.
- Heaviest Northern Premier League Defeat – 6–0 vs. Stalybridge Celtic in 2002–03.

Player Records

- Most Appearances for Club – Steve Johnson; 600-plus.
- Most Goals for Club – Pete O'Brien; 247.
- Most Goals in a Season – Ernest Gillibrand; 86 in 1929–30 season.
- Most Goals in a Game – Ernest Gillibrand 7 vs. New Mills in the 1929–30 season.
- Largest Transfer Fee Received – £50,000 for Colin Little to Crewe Alexandra in 1995.
- Largest Transfer Fee Paid – £8,000 for Jim McCluskie from Mossley in 1989.

=== Hyde United FC ===
- Best FA Cup performance: First round, 1954-55, 1983–84, 1994–95, 2017–18
- Best FA Trophy performance: Semi-finals, 1988–89, 1994–95, 1995–96

== Honours ==
The list of Honours that Hyde have achieved is as follows:

=== League ===
- Conference North
  - 2011–12
- Northern Premier League
  - 2004–05
- Northern Premier League Division One
  - 2003–04
- Cheshire League
  - 1954–55, 1955–56, 1981–82
- Manchester League
  - 1920–21, 1921–22, 1922–23, 1928–29, 1929–30

=== Cup ===
- FA Cup
  - First Round 1955–56, 1983–84, 1994–95, 2017–18
- FA Trophy
  - Semi-finals 1988–89, 1994–95, 1995–96
- Cheshire Senior Cup
  - Winners 1945–46, 1962–63, 1969–70, 1980–81, 1989–90, 1996–97
- Manchester Premier Cup
  - Winners 1993–94, 1994–95, 1995–96, 1998–99, 2004–05, 2005–06
- Manchester Senior Cup
  - Winners 1974–75
- Northern Premier League Challenge Cup
  - Winners 1985–86, 1989–90, 1995–96
- Northern Premier League Chairman's Cup
  - Winners 1999–2000, 2003–04
- Cheshire League Cup
  - Winners 1933–34, 1952–53, 1954–55, 1972–73, 1981–82

== See also ==
- Ray Stanley Memorial Trophy
