= Paddy Atkinson =

English footballer

Personal information
- Full name: Patrick Atkinson
- Date of birth: 22 May 1970 (age 56)
- Place of birth: Singapore
- Position: Left back

Team information
- Current team: Whitley Bay (Manager)

Youth career
- 1987–1988: Sheffield United

Senior career*
Years	Team	Apps	(Gls)
1988–1990	Hartlepool United	31	(3)
1990–1991	Gateshead	14	(1)
1991–1992	Newcastle Blue Star	.	
1992–1993	Barrow	40	(10)
1993–1995	Workington	84	(22)
1995–1998	York City	60	(0)
1998–1999	Scarborough	26	(0)
1999	Barrow	60	
1999–2000	Blyth Spartans	15	
2000–2003	Queen of the South	84	(5)
- Blyth Spartans
- Durham City
2005–	Newcastle Benfield		
- * Club domestic league appearances and goals as of 29 October 2006

Patrick Darren Atkinson (born 22 May 1970) is an English former professional footballer.
