= David McNiven (footballer, born 1955) =

Scottish footballer

Personal information
- Full name: David Scott McNiven
- Date of birth: 9 September 1955 (age 71)
- Place of birth: Stonehouse, Scotland
- Position: Forward

Senior career*
Years	Team	Apps	(Gls)
1972–1978	Leeds United	22	(6)
1978–1983	Bradford City	212	(64)
1983–1985	Blackpool	49	(11)
1985	Pittsburgh Spirit (indoor)		
1985	Halifax Town	12	(4)
- Morecambe
Total		295	(85)

International career
1976–1977	Scotland U21	3	(1)
- * Club domestic league appearances and goals

David Scott McNiven (born 9 September 1955) is a Scottish former professional footballer who played as a forward.

== Club career ==
Born in Stonehouse, McNiven played for Leeds United, Bradford City, Blackpool, Pittsburgh Spirit, Halifax Town and Morecambe. He joined Leeds United at the age of 15, having been scouted by the club.

McNiven signed for Bradford City in February 1978 from Leeds, leaving in February 1983 to join Blackpool. He scored 66 goals in 245 appearances for the club in all competitions: 64 goals in 212 league appearances, two goals in 11 FA Cup appearances, and no goals in 22 FL Trophy appearances.

He made his debut for Blackpool in 1983, scoring the only goal in a victory over Rochdale at home. He started every subsequent game in the 1982–83 campaign, scoring four more goals as the club finished fourth-bottom of Division 4 and had to seek re-election. The following season saw McNiven make 32 League appearances and score six goals. He also scored one of the two goals that put Blackpool into the Fourth Round of the FA Cup at the expense of Manchester City.

== International career ==
He earned three caps for the Scotland under-21 team.

== Family ==
His sons David and Scott are both footballers as well, while his uncle Tom was a coach.

== Sources ==
- Calley, Roy (1992). Blackpool: A Complete Record 1887–1992.
- Frost, Terry (1988). Bradford City A Complete Record 1903–1988. Breedon Books Sport. ISBN 0-907969-38-0.
