= Gary Himsworth =

English footballer

Personal information
- Full name: Gary Paul Himsworth
- Date of birth: 19 December 1969 (age 56)
- Place of birth: Appleton-le-Moors, England
- Height: 5 ft 8 in (1.73 m)
- Position: Midfielder

Senior career*
Years	Team	Apps	(Gls)
1988–1990	York City	88	(0)
1990–1993	Scarborough	92	(6)
1993–1996	Darlington	94	(8)
1996–1999	York City	69	(3)
1999–2002	Darlington	48	(1)
- * Club domestic league appearances and goals

Gary Paul Himsworth (born 19 December 1969) is an English former footballer who made nearly 500 appearances in the Football League playing for York City, Scarborough and Darlington.

== Career ==
Himsworth came fourth out of 10,000 entrants in a Rising Star national football competition, sponsored by Bobby Charlton, when he was 14.
