= Rodney Rowe (footballer) =

English footballer (born 1975)

Personal information
- Full name: Rodney Carl Rowe
- Date of birth: 30 July 1975 (age 51)
- Place of birth: Huddersfield, England
- Position: Striker

Youth career
- Huddersfield Town

Senior career*
Years	Team	Apps	(Gls)
1993–1997	Huddersfield Town	34	(2)
1994	→ Scarborough (loan)	14	(1)
1995	→ Bury (loan)	3	(0)
1997–1999	York City	96	(21)
1999	→ Halifax Town (loan)	9	(2)
1999–2001	Gillingham	22	(4)
2001–2002	Hull City	35	(8)
2002	Wakefield & Emley	15	(4)
2002–2003	Ashton United	?	(?)
2003–2005	Ossett Town	1	(1)
2005–2006	Farsley Celtic	6	(4)
2006	Bradford Park Avenue	?	(?)
- * Club domestic league appearances and goals

Rodney Carl Rowe (born 30 July 1975) is an English former footballer who played for a number of clubs in Northern England.

== Career ==
=== Huddersfield Town ===
Rowe signed a professional contract at Huddersfield Town on 12 July 1993, where he spent 5 years at his home-town club. He played a total of 46 games, mostly from the sub's bench, and scored five goals. One of these goals came in a Football League Trophy tie where he scored the winner. Rowe also played for Scarborough and Bury during this time, on loan. He played three games for Bury without scoring, and played 18 for Scarborough scoring twice in all competitions.

=== York City ===
Rowe spent three years at York, playing 108 games and scoring 28 in all competitions. He received a £150 fine in March 1998, while playing for City, after pushing a woman into a wheelie bin, admitting to common assault at Selby Magistrates' Court. Also during this time Rowe was loaned out to Halifax Town.

=== Gillingham ===
Rowe signed for Gillingham on 23 November 1999 for £30,000 and failed to impress. He played 23 games in all competitions, 14 of those appearances coming from the bench, scoring just four goals during that time.

=== Hull City ===
Rowe signed for Hull City in 2001 on a free transfer. Hull turned out to be his last Football League club and scored eight goals in 37 appearances. Rowe then dropped down to non-League, in 2002, to play for Emley.

=== Non-League career ===
Only months after signing for Emley, where Rowe played 15 game and scored four goals, he signed for Ashton United. In 2003, he left Ashton for Ossett Town where he stayed until 2005 when he moved onto Farsley Celtic. He stayed there until 2006 and signed for Bradford Park Avenue. Rowe is thought to have left the club soon after signing.
