= Scott Jordan (footballer) =

English association football player

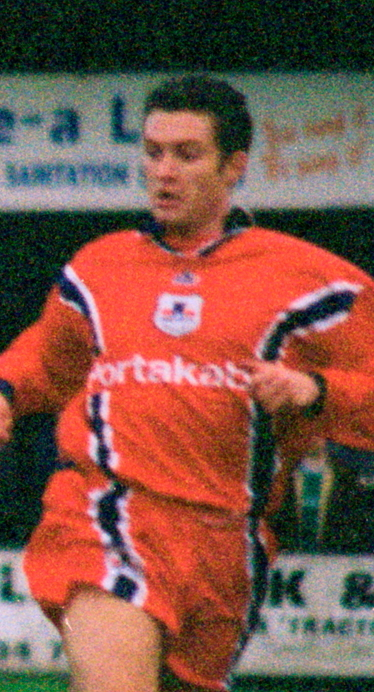
- Jordan playing for York City in 1998

Personal information
- Full name: Scott Douglas Jordan
- Date of birth: 19 July 1975 (age 51)
- Place of birth: Newcastle upon Tyne, England
- Height: 5 ft 10 in (1.78 m)
- Position: Midfielder

Senior career*
Years	Team	Apps	(Gls)
1992–2001	York City	167	(12)
2001–2003	Scarborough	41	(3)
Total		208	(15)
- * Club domestic league appearances and goals

Scott Douglas Jordan (born 19 July 1975) is an English former professional footballer who played as a midfielder in the Football League for York City.

== Early life ==
Jordan was born in Newcastle upon Tyne, Tyne and Wear.

== Career ==
Jordan played for York City when they beat Manchester United 3–0 at Old Trafford in the League Cup in September 1995. He also played in the return leg at Bootham Crescent, scoring what proved to be the decisive goal in a 3–1 defeat that nevertheless saw York progress to the next round on aggregate.
