= Neil Campbell (footballer) =

English footballer (1977–2022)

Personal information
- Full name: Neil Andrew Campbell
- Date of birth: 26 January 1977
- Place of birth: Middlesbrough, England
- Date of death: 30 April 2022 (aged 45)
- Place of death: Yarm, England
- Height: 6 ft 3 in (1.91 m)
- Position: Striker

Senior career*
Years	Team	Apps	(Gls)
1995–1997	York City	12	(1)
1997–1999	Scarborough	47	(7)
1998	→ Telford United (loan)	?	(?)
1999–2000	Southend United	24	(3)
2000–2002	Doncaster Rovers	74	(16)
2002–2003	Scarborough	22	(4)
2003	Leigh RMI	12	(0)
2003	Barrow	54	(34)
- * Club domestic league appearances and goals

Neil Andrew Campbell (26 January 1977 – 30 April 2022) was an English footballer who played in the Football League for York City, Scarborough and Southend United. Once his football career ended, he entered education with pupil referral before becoming a member of Acklam Grange School's senior leadership team in 2014.

== Death ==
Campbell died on 30 April 2022 at the age of 45. He had been out to dinner in Yarm. Acklam Grange school would later give his funeral procession a guard of honor on 18 May.

== Honours ==
Leigh RMI

- Lancashire FA Challenge Trophy: 2002−03
