= Martin Reed =

English footballer

Personal information
- Full name: Martin John Reed
- Date of birth: 10 January 1978 (age 48)
- Place of birth: Scarborough, England
- Height: 6 ft 0 in (1.83 m)
- Position: Defender

Youth career
- –1996: York City

Senior career*
Years	Team	Apps	(Gls)
1996–2001	York City	46	(0)
2001–	Scarborough	3	(0)
Total		49	(0)
- * Club domestic league appearances and goals

Martin John Reed (born 10 January 1978) is an English former professional footballer who played as a defender in the Football League for York City, and in non-League football for Scarborough.
