= Neil Tolson =

English footballer (born 1973)

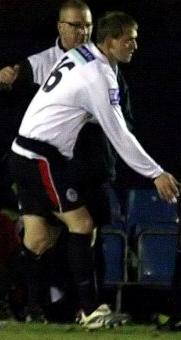
- Tolson playing for Hyde

Personal information
- Date of birth: 25 October 1973 (age 53)
- Place of birth: Walsall, England
- Height: 6 ft 1 in (1.85 m)
- Position: Striker

Senior career*
Years	Team	Apps	(Gls)
1991–1992	Walsall	9	(1)
1992–1993	Oldham Athletic	3	(0)
1993–1996	Bradford City	63	(12)
1995	→ Chester City (loan)	4	(0)
1996–1999	York City	72	(13)
1999–2001	Southend United	36	(11)
2002–2003	Leigh RMI	10	(1)
2003	Kettering Town	1	(0)
2003	Halifax Town	3	(0)
2003–2011	Hyde United	124	(54)
Total		325	(92)

Managerial career
- 2008–2011: Hyde United
- 2016: Altrincham(Caretaker)
- * Club domestic league appearances and goals

Neil Tolson (born 25 October 1973) is an English former footballer who played in the Football League as a striker. He later moved onto a coaching career with Hyde, Altrincham and Stalybridge Celtic.

== Career ==
Born in Dudley, Worcestershire, Tolson began his career with Walsall before moving onto Oldham Athletic. He joined Bradford City in 1993, where he stayed for four years. He helped them win promotion though was an unused substitute in their play-off final. He left that summer and joined York City and was their top scorer for the 1996–97 season, with 17 goals in all competitions, including one as York beat Premier League side Everton 3–2 in the second round second leg of the League Cup.

He was released by Leigh RMI in January 2003 and joined Kettering Town in February. He signed for Halifax Town a month later.

Tolson joined Hyde United in July 2003 and then played six matches for Mossley after joining them the following month. He then joined Stalybridge Celtic in October 2003, staying with them until January 2004. He returned to Hyde, and was appointed Assistant Manager of the club in July 2007 before becoming player-manager in September 2008. After eight years at the club playing roles of manager, player and assistant manager, on 4 April 2011 he was relieved of his duties by the new board of directors. He left having scored 82 goals in 176 appearances for the club in all competitions.

In June 2011 he joined Altrincham as assistant manager to Lee Sinnott. In this role, he helped the club achieve promotion via the playoffs to the Conference National. Following Sinnott's departure, Tolson served as caretaker manager from March 2016 until the end of the season.

He later took the role of assistant manager at Stalybridge Celtic F.C. during the 2016/17 season.

In 2018, he took a full-time coaching job in with American club FC Wisconsin.
