= 2013–14 Fleetwood Town F.C. season =

Fleetwood Town F.C.
2013–14 season
- Chairman: Andrew Pilley
- Manager: Graham Alexander
- Stadium: Highbury Stadium
- League Two: 4th (promoted via play-offs)
- FA Cup: Second round (eliminated by Burton Albion)
- League Cup: First round (eliminated by Notts County)
- League Trophy: Area final (eliminated by Chesterfield)
- Top goalscorer: League: Jamille Matt (6 goals); All: Jamille Matt (11 goals)
- Highest home attendance: 5,194 vs. York, 18 May 2014
Home colours	Away colours

The 2013–14 season was Fleetwood Town's second-consecutive season in Football League Two.

== League Two Data ==
=== League table ===
Pos	Team	Pld	W	D	L	GF	GA	GD	Pts	Promotion, qualification or relegation
2	Scunthorpe United (P)	46	20	21	5	68	44	+24	81	Promotion to Football League One
3	Rochdale (P)	46	24	9	13	69	48	+21	81	Promotion to Football League One
4	Fleetwood Town (O, P)	46	22	10	14	66	52	+14	76	Qualification for League Two play-offs
5	Southend United	46	19	15	12	56	39	+17	72	Qualification for League Two play-offs
6	Burton Albion	46	19	15	12	47	42	+5	72	Qualification for League Two play-offs

Updated to match(es) played on 3 May 2014. Source: BBC Sport
Rules for classification: 1) Points; 2) Goal difference; 3) Number of goals scored
(O) Play-off winners; (P) Promoted

=== Result Summary ===
Overall								Home						Away					
Pld	W	D	L	GF	GA	GD	Pts	W	D	L	GF	GA	GD	W	D	L	GF	GA	GD
46	22	10	14	66	52	+14	76	11	6	6	41	30	+11	11	4	8	25	22	+3

Last updated: 6 August 2014.
Source: http://www.football-league.co.uk/page/DivisionalLeagueTable/0,,10794~201326,00.html

=== Result by round ===
Round	1	2	3	4	5	6	7	8	9	10	11	12	13	14	15	16	17	18	19	20	21	22	23	24	25	26	27	28	29	30	31	32	33	34	35	36	37	38	39	40	41	42	43	44	45	46
Ground	H	A	H	A	A	H	H	A	H	A	H	A	H	A	H	A	H	A	H	A	H	A	H	A	H	A	A	H	A	H	A	H	H	A	A	A	H	A	H	H	A	H	A	H	H	A
Result	W	W	L	W	L	W	W	W	L	W	D	L	L	W	W	L	W	L	D	W	L	L	W	W	W	W	D	L	D	W	L	L	D	D	W	D	W	L	W	D	W	D	W	W	D	L
Position	4	2	6	3	6	4	3	2	4	2	2	2	5	3	1	4	4	5	7	3	4	8	7	6	6	3	3	4	6	5	5	6	6	6	5	5	4	4	4	4	4	4	4	4	4	4

Source: Statto.com
A = Away; H = Home; W = Win; D = Draw; L = Loss

== Kit ==
Supplier: Puma
Sponsor(s): BES Gas

Home

Last updated: 2 June 2013.
Source: Historic Football Kits - SkyBet League 2 2013-14

== Squad ==
No.	Name	Position (s)	Nationality	Place of birth	Date of birth (age)	Club caps	Club goals	Int. caps	Int. goals	Signed from	Date signed	Fee	Contract End
Goalkeepers
1	Scott Davies	GK	(England)	Thornton-Cleveleys	27 February 1987 (age 39)	134	0	–	–	Morecambe	24 June 2010	Free	30 June 2016
29	Chris Maxwell	GK	(Wales)	St Asaph	30 July 1990 (age 36)	–	–	–	–	Wrexham	25 May 2012	Free	Undisclosed
33	David Lucas	GK	(England)	Preston	23 November 1977 (age 48)	2	0	–	–	Birmingham City	1 January 2013	Undisclosed	Undisclosed
Defenders
2	Shaun Beeley	RB	(England)	Stockport	21 November 1988 (age 37)	116	3	–	–	Academy	1 August 2008	Trainee	30 June 2014
3	Dean Howell	LB	(England)	Burton upon Trent	29 November 1980 (age 45)	33	1	–	–	Crawley Town	1 July 2012	Free	31 January 2014
5	Mark Roberts	CB	(England)	Northwich	16 October 1983 (age 43)	1	1	–	–	Stevenage	3 July 2013	Free	Undisclosed
6	Nathan Pond	CB/DM	(England)	Preston	1 May 1985 (age 41)	78	3	–	–	Academy	1 July 2004	Trainee	30 June 2014
13	Alan Goodall	LB	(England)	Birkenhead	2 December 1981 (age 44)	65	4	–	–	Stockport County	1 June 2011	Free	30 June 2014
14	Liam Hogan	CB	(England)		8 February 1989 (age 37)	1	0	–	–	FC Halifax Town	1 July 2013	Free	30 June 2015
15	Conor McLaughlin	RB/LB	(Northern Ireland)	Belfast	26 July 1991 (age 35)	21	0	–	–	Preston North End	20 July 2012	Free	Undisclosed
16	Ryan Cresswell	CB	(England)	Rotherham	22 December 1987 (age 38)	1	1	–	–	Southend United	23 July 2013	Undisclosed	30 June 2015
20	Charlie Taylor	LB	(England)	York	18 September 1993 (age 33)	–	–	–	–	Leeds United	15 October 2013	Loan	November 2013
25	Stephen Jordan	LB/RB	(England)	Warrington	6 March 1982 (age 44)	1	0	–	–	Dunfermline Athletic	12 July 2013	Free	Undisclosed
Midfielders
4	Stewart Murdoch	DM/RM/LM	(Scotland)	Aberdeen	9 May 1990 (age 36)	1	0	–	–	Falkirk	14 June 2013	Free	30 June 2015
7	Gareth Evans	RW/LW	(England)	Macclesfield	26 April 1988 (age 38)	17	1	–	–	Rotherham United	1 January 2013	Free	30 June 2015
8	Steven Schumacher	CM/DM	(England)	Liverpool	30 April 1984 (age 42)	1	0	–	–	Bury	1 July 2013	Undisclosed	30 June 2015
11	Jeff Hughes	LM/CM	(Northern Ireland)	Larne	29 May 1985 (age 41)	1	1	2	0	Notts County	1 July 2013	Free	30 June 2015
12	Junior Brown	DM/RB/CB	(England)	Crewe	7 May 1989 (age 37)	91	13	–	–	Crewe Alexandra	1 August 2010	Free	30 June 2015
17	Matty Blair	LW/RW	(England)	Warwick	21 June 1989 (age 37)	–	–	–	–	York City	1 July 2013	Free	Undisclosed
18	Antoni Sarcevic	AM	(England)	Manchester	13 March 1992 (age 34)	1	0	–	–	Chester	26 June 2013	Undisclosed	30 June 2016
20	Damien Johnson	CM/RM	(Northern Ireland)	Lisburn	18 November 1978 (age 48)	23	0	56	0	Plymouth Argyle	7 June 2012	Free	Undisclosed
Forwards
9	Jon Parkin	CF	(England)	Barnsley	30 December 1981 (age 44)	24	10	–	–	Cardiff City	13 July 2012	Free	30 June 2014
10	Jamille Matt	CF	(England)		2 December 1990 (age 35)	15	3	–	–	Kidderminster Harriers	11 January 2013	£200,000	30 June 2014
19	Steven Gillespie	CF	(England)	Liverpool	4 June 1985 (age 41)	25	4	–	–	Colchester United	18 June 2012	Undisclosed	Undisclosed
21	Jamie Allen	CF	(England)		25 May 1995 (age 31)	4	1	–	–	Academy	1 July 2012	Trainee	30 June 2015
22	Alex Titchiner	CF	(Wales)	St Asaph	13 June 1991 (age 35)	10	0	–	–	Witton Albion	25 May 2012	Free	30 June 2014
23	David Ball	CF	(England)	Whitefield	14 December 1989 (age 36)	39	9	–	–	Peterborough United	23 July 2012	Undisclosed	30 June 2015
24	Ryan Crowther	RW	(England)	Stockport	17 September 1988 (age 38)	19	2	–	–	Hyde	18 November 2011	Free	Undisclosed

=== Statistics ===
As of 23 October 2013

No.	Pos	Nat	Player	Total		League Two		FA Cup		League Cup		League Trophy	
No.	Pos	Nat	Player	Apps	Goals	Apps	Goals	Apps	Goals	Apps	Goals	Apps	Goals
1	GK	(England) ENG	Scott Davies	15	0	13	0	0	0	1	0	1	0
3	DF	(England) ENG	Dean Howell	9	0	6+2	0	0	0	0	0	1	0
4	MF	(Scotland) SCO	Stewart Murdoch	13	0	6+5	0	0	0	1	0	1	0
5	DF	(England) ENG	Mark Roberts	7	1	6	1	0	0	1	0	0	0
6	DF	(England) ENG	Nathan Pond	12	0	10+1	0	0	0	0	0	1	0
7	MF	(England) ENG	Gareth Evans	12	2	7+3	1	0	0	1	1	1	0
8	MF	(England) ENG	Steven Schumacher	10	0	8+1	0	0	0	0	0	1	0
9	FW	(England) ENG	Jon Parkin	6	2	1+5	2	0	0	0	0	0	0
10	FW	(England) ENG	Jamille Matt	14	6	6+6	4	0	0	0+1	0	1	2
11	MF	(Northern Ireland) NIR	Jeff Hughes	14	3	13	3	0	0	1	0	0	0
12	MF	(England) ENG	Junior Brown	15	0	11+2	0	0	0	0+1	0	1	0
13	DF	(England) ENG	Alan Goodall	0	0	0	0	0	0	0	0	0	0
14	DF	(England) ENG	Liam Hogan	12	0	9+2	0	0	0	1	0	0	0
15	DF	(Northern Ireland) NIR	Conor McLaughlin	6	0	4+1	0	0	0	0	0	1	0
16	DF	(England) ENG	Ryan Cresswell	11	1	9	1	0	0	1	0	1	0
17	MF	(England) ENG	Matty Blair	9	2	2+5	2	0	0	1	0	1	0
18	MF	(England) ENG	Antoni Sarcevic	14	3	13	3	0	0	1	0	0	0
19	FW	(England) ENG	Steven Gillespie	0	0	0	0	0	0	0	0	0	0
20	DF	(England) ENG	Charlie Taylor (on loan from Leeds United	2	0	2	0	0	0	0	0	0	0
21	FW	(England) ENG	Jamie Allen	0	0	0	0	0	0	0	0	0	0
23	FW	(England) ENG	David Ball	13	3	7+5	2	0	0	1	1	0	0
24	FW	(England) ENG	Ryan Crowther	7	0	5+1	0	0	0	0+1	0	0	0
25	DF	(England) ENG	Stephen Jordan	6	0	5	0	0	0	1	0	0	0
26	MF	(England) ENG	Richard Wright	0	0	0	0	0	0	0	0	0	0
27	MF	(England) ENG	Jake Parker	0	0	0	0	0	0	0	0	0	0
33	GK	(England) ENG	David Lucas	0	0	0	0	0	0	0	0	0	0

==== Goalscorers ====
Rank	No.	Pos.	Name	League Two	FA Cup	League Cup	League Trophy	Total
1	10	FW	Jamille Matt	4	0	0	2	6
2	23	FW	David Ball	3	0	1	0	4
3	11	MF	Jeff Hughes	3	0	0	0	3
3	18	MF	Antoni Sarcevic	3	0	0	0	3
4	7	MF	Gareth Evans	1	0	1	0	2
4	9	FW	Jon Parkin	2	0	0	0	2
4	17	MF	Matty Blair	2	0	0	0	2
7	5	DF	Mark Roberts	1	0	0	0	1
7	16	DF	Ryan Cresswell	1	0	0	0	1
7	Own Goals			1	0	0	0	1
Total				20	0	2	2	24

==== Disciplinary record ====
No.	Pos.	Name	League Two		FA Cup		League Cup		League Trophy		Total	
No.	Pos.	Name	Yellow card	Red card	Yellow card	Red card	Yellow card	Red card	Yellow card	Red card	Yellow card	Red card
4	MF	Sean Murdoch	1	0	0	0	0	0	0	0	1	0
5	DF	Mark Roberts	1	0	0	0	0	0	0	0	1	0
6	DF	Nathan Pond	0	0	0	0	0	0	1	0	1	0
8	MF	Steven Schumacher	2	0	0	0	0	0	1	0	3	0
9	FW	Jon Parkin	1	0	0	0	0	0	0	0	1	0
10	FW	Jamille Matt	3	0	0	0	0	0	0	0	3	0
11	MF	Jeff Hughes	3	0	0	0	0	0	0	0	3	0
12	MF	Junior Brown	1	0	0	0	0	0	0	0	1	0
14	DF	Liam Hogan	2	0	0	0	1	0	0	0	3	0
16	DF	Ryan Cresswell	2	0	0	0	0	0	0	0	2	0
18	MF	Antoni Sarcevic	1	0	0	0	0	0	0	0	1	0
Total			17	0	0	0	1	0	2	0	20	0

=== Contracts ===
No.	Pos.	Nat.	Name	Age	Status	Contract length	Expiry date	Source
21	FW	(England)	Jamie Allen	17	Extended	1 year	June 2014	BBC Sport
2	DF	(England)	Shaun Beeley	24	Extended	1 year	June 2014	BBC Sport
7	MF	(England)	Gareth Evans	25	Signed	2 years	June 2015	Fleetwood Town FC
9	FW	(England)	Jon Parkin	31	Signed	1 year	June 2014	BBC Sport
21	FW	(England)	Jamie Allen	17	Signed	2 years	June 2015	BBC Sport

== Transfers ==
=== In ===
No.	Pos.	Nat.	Name	Age	EU	Moving from	Type	Transfer window	Ends	Transfer fee	Source
17	MF	(England)	Matty Blair	24	EU	York City	Free transfer	Summer	Undisclosed	Free	BBC Sport
8	MF	(England)	Steven Schumacher	29	EU	Bury	Transfer	Summer	2015	Undisclosed	BBC Sport
14	DF	(England)	Liam Hogan	?	EU	FC Halifax Town	Free transfer	Summer	2015	Free	BBC Sport
11	MF	(Northern Ireland)	Jeff Hughes	28	EU	Notts County	Free transfer	Summer	2015	Free	BBC Sport
4	MF	(Scotland)	Stewart Murdoch	23	EU	Falkirk (Scotland)	Free transfer	Summer	2015	Free	BBC Sport
18	MF	(England)	Antoni Sarcevic	21	EU	Chester	Transfer	Summer	2016	Undisclosed	BBC Sport
5	DF	(England)	Mark Roberts	29	EU	Stevenage	Free transfer	Summer	Undisclosed	Free	BBC Sport
25	DF	(England)	Stephen Jordan	31	EU	Dunfermline Athletic (Scotland)	Free transfer	Summer	Undisclosed	Free	BBC Sport
16	DF	(England)	Ryan Cresswell	25	EU	Southend United	Transfer	Summer	2015	Undisclosed	BBC Sport

=== Loan In ===
No.	Pos.	Name	Country	Age	Loan club	Started	Ended	Start source	End source
20	DF	Charlie Taylor	(England)	41	Leeds United	August		BBC Sport	

Sources: For loan start source see "Start source". For loan end source see "End source".
EU = if holds or not a European Union passport; Country: when 2 flags, 1st flag = country that plays for internationally, 2nd flag = country of birth; No. = number on jersey; P = Position (for position name, pause mouse pointer on abbreviation); Name = Name on jersey (for more extensive name, pause mouse pointer on name); In/Out = In: The player came in on loan, Out: The player went out on loan; Loan club = the club that the player moved on loan to or the club that the player came from on loan; Started = the date when the player's loan started; Ended = the date when the player's loan ended.

=== Out ===
No.	Pos.	Name	Country	Age	Type	Moving to	Transfer window	Transfer fee	Apps	Goals	Source
29	FW	Richie Allen	(England)	30	Contract Ended	Free agent	Summer	Free	3	0	BBC Sport
25	DF	Rob Atkinson	(England)	26	Contract Ended	Accrington Stanley	Summer	Free	36	1	BBC Sport
4	MF	Anthony Barry	(England)	27	Contract Ended	Forest Green Rovers	Summer	Free	62	2	BBC Sport
23	DF	Kieran Charnock	(England)	28	Contract Ended	Stockport County	Summer	Free	9	2	Stockport County FC
5	FW	Jean-Michel Fontaine	(Réunion)	24	Contract Ended	Free agent	Summer	Free	13	0	BBC Sport
35	MF	Mozzi Gyorio	(Canada) (Serbia)	23	Contract Ended	Free agent	Summer	Free	1	0	BBC Sport
14	FW	Andy Mangan	(England)	26	Contract Ended	Forest Green Rovers	Summer	Free	59	24	BBC Sport
28	DF	Youl Mawéné	(France)	33	Contract Ended	Retired	Summer	N/A	21	0	BBC Sport
18	MF	Jamie McGuire	(England)	29	Contract Ended	Mansfield Town	Summer	Free	122	11	BBC Sport
10	MF	Barry Nicholson	(Scotland)	34	Contract Ended	Free agent	Summer	Free	33	2	BBC Sport
30	FW	Danny Rowe	(England)	23	Contract Ended	Lincoln City	Summer	Free	7	0	BBC Sport
22	DF	Liam Wynn	(England)	18	Contract Ended	Free agent	Summer	Free	0	0	BBC Sport
7	MF	Danny Rose	(England)	25	Contract Ended	Oxford United	Summer	Free	10	2	BBC Sport
2	DF	Shaun Beeley	(England)	24	Loan	Bury	Summer	Six Month Loan	116	3	BBC Sport

EU = if holds or not a European Union passport; Country: when 2 flags, 1st flag = country that plays for internationally, 2nd flag = country of birth; N = number on jersey; P = Position (for position name, pause mouse pointer on abbreviation); Name = Name on jersey (for more extensive name, pause mouse pointer on name); Age = age on the day of the signing; Moving from = only indicate the club the player was playing before start playing for this club in this season, for the type of the moving see Status column; Moving to = only indicates the club the player is going to play next, for the type of the moving see Status column; Ends = when the player's current contract ends; n/a = Not applicable; Apps = Total number of competitive appearances (including substitute appearances) at the club prior to departure; Goals = Total number of competitive goals scored at the club prior to departure.

=== Loans out ===
No.	Pos.	Name	Country	Age	Loan club	Started	Ended	Start source	End source
22	FW	Alex Tichiner	(Wales)	35	Chester	4 July	January	BBC Sport	
2	DF	Shaun Beeley	(England)	27	Bury	30 July	January	BBC Sport	
19	FW	Steven Gillespie	(England)	41	Cheltenham Town	15 August		BBC Sport	
13	DF	Alan Goodall	(England)	44	Grimsby Town	2 September		BBC Sport	

Sources: For loan start source see "Start source". For loan end source see "End source".
EU = if holds or not a European Union passport; Country: when 2 flags, 1st flag = country that plays for internationally, 2nd flag = country of birth; No. = number on jersey; P = Position (for position name, pause mouse pointer on abbreviation); Name = Name on jersey (for more extensive name, pause mouse pointer on name); In/Out = In: The player came in on loan, Out: The player went out on loan; Loan club = the club that the player moved on loan to or the club that the player came from on loan; Started = the date when the player's loan started; Ended = the date when the player's loan ended.

== Fixtures and results ==
=== Pre-season ===
6 July	Northwich Victoria	1–2	Fleetwood Town	Flixton
15:00 BST	Harris	Report	38' Parkin; 52' Matt	Stadium: Valley Road

9 July	SV Bad Ischl	0–8	Fleetwood Town	Bad Ischl
19:45 BST		Report	Matt; Blair; Evans; Schumacher; Brown; Parkin	Stadium: OKO-box Stadium

20 July Testimonial Match	Fleetwood Town	4–0	Preston North End	Fleetwood
15:00 BST				Stadium: Highbury Stadium

24 July	Fleetwood Town	2–0	Coventry City	Fleetwood
19:45 BST	Ball 81'; Sarcevic 86'			Stadium: Highbury Stadium

27 July	Southport	1–1	Fleetwood Town	Southport
15:00 BST	Ball 23'	Report	45' (pen.) Milligan	Stadium: Merseyrail Community Stadium

=== League Two ===
3 August 1	Fleetwood Town	3–1	Dagenham & Redbridge	Fleetwood
15:00 BST	Roberts 6'; Hughes 10'; Cresswell 57'	Report	Murphy 26'	Stadium: Highbury Stadium; Attendance: 2,511; Referee: Seb Stockbridge

10 August 2	Plymouth Argyle	0–2	Fleetwood Town	Plymouth
15:00 BST		Report	10', 12' Ball	Stadium: Home Park; Attendance: 7,280; Referee: Chris Sarginson

17 August 3	Fleetwood Town	2–3	Burton Albion	Fleetwood
15:00 BST	Hughes 65'; Matt 72'	Report	12' Howe; 25' McGurk; 34' Hussey	Stadium: Highbury Stadium; Attendance: 2,611; Referee: Bratt

24 August 4	Hartlepool United	0–1	Fleetwood Town	Hartlepool
15:00 BST		Report	16' Hughes	Stadium: Victoria Park; Attendance: 3,297; Referee: Rushton

31 August 5	AFC Wimbledon	2–0	Fleetwood Town	London
15:00 BST	Pell 42' (pen.); Smith 45'	Report		Stadium: Kingsmeadow; Attendance: 3,744; Referee: Williamson

7 September 6	Fleetwood Town	4–1	Torquay United	Fleetwood
15:00 BST	Sarcevic 10', 37'; Matt 62'; Blair 90'	Report	Benyon 89'	Stadium: Highbury Stadium; Attendance: 2,426; Referee: Drysdale

14 September 7	Fleetwood Town	2–1	Bury	Fleetwood
15:00 BST	Sarcevic 52'; Evans 64'	Report	Soares 28'	Stadium: Highbury Stadium; Attendance: 3,520; Referee: Salisbury

21 September 8	Portsmouth	0–1	Fleetwood Town	Portsmouth
15:00 BST		Report	Bradley 67' (o.g.)	Stadium: Fratton Park; Attendance: 15,809; Referee: Horwood

28 September 9	Fleetwood Town	1–2	Exeter City	Fleetwood
15:00 BST	Blair 71'	Report	Bennett 76', 79'	Stadium: Highbury Stadium; Attendance: 2,557; Referee: Haywood

5 October 10	Bristol Rovers	1–3	Fleetwood Town	Bristol
15:00 BST	O'Toole 66'	Report	Matt 64', 87'; Parkin 90'	Stadium: Memorial Stadium; Attendance: 5,303; Referee: Micheal Bull

12 October 11	Fleetwood Town	1–1	Chesterfield	Fleetwood
15:00 BST	Parkin 89'	Report	Cooper 55'	Stadium: Highbury Stadium; Attendance: 4,521; Referee: Robert Lewis

18 October 12	Southend United	2–0	Fleetwood Town	Southend-on-Sea
19:45 BST	Corr 21', 81' (pen.)			Stadium: Roots Hall; Attendance: 4,996; Referee: Andy Woolmer

22 October 13	Fleetwood Town	0–1	Scunthorpe United	Fleetwood
19:45 BST		Report	Winnall 59'	Stadium: Highbury Stadium; Attendance: 2,492; Referee: Mark Heywood

26 October 14	York City	0–2	Fleetwood Town	York
15:00 BST			Evans 24'; Matt 66'	Stadium: Bootham Crescent; Attendance: 3,523; Referee: Kevin Wright

2 November 15	Fleetwood Town	4–1	Newport County	Fleetwood
15:00 BST	Schumacher 4', 48', 59'; Ball 78'		Zebroski 71'	Stadium: Highbury Stadium; Attendance: 2,354; Referee: Andy Haines

16 November 16	Northampton	1–0	Fleetwood Town	Northampton
15:00 BST	Norris 90'	Report		Stadium: Sixfields Stadium; Attendance: 4,076; Referee: Garry Sutton

23 November 17	Fleetwood Town	5–4	Mansfield	Fleetwood
15:00 BST	Evans 1', 66'; Sarcevic 35' (pen.), 64', 90' (pen.)	Report	Clements 9'; Howell 13'; Clucas 77'; R. Dyer 89'	Stadium: Highbury Stadium; Attendance: 2,831; Referee: Scott Mathieson

26 November 2013 18	Accrington Stanley	2–0	Fleetwood Town	Accrington
19:45 GMT	Webber 75' (pen.); Odejayi 82'	Report		Stadium: Crown Ground; Attendance: 1,699; Referee: Oliver Langford

30 November 2013 19	Fleetwood Town	1–1	Oxford United	Fleetwood
15:00	Schumacher 12'	Report	Kitson 89'	Stadium: Highbury Stadium; Attendance: 2,739; Referee: Darren Bond

14 December 2013 20	Rochdale	1–2	Fleetwood Town	Rochdale
15:00 GMT	Hogan 40'	Report	Sarcevic 50' (pen.); Roberts 83'	Stadium: Spotland Stadium; Attendance: 2,698; Referee: Richard Clark

21 December 2013 21	Fleetwood Town	0–2	Cheltenham Town	Fleetwood
15:00		Report	Brown 1'; McGlashan 90'	Stadium: Highbury Stadium; Attendance: 2,300; Referee: Chris Sarginson

26 December 2013 22	Morecambe	1–0	Fleetwood Town	Morecambe
	Amond 19'	Report		Stadium: Globe Arena; Attendance: 3,008; Referee: Paul Tierney

1 January 2014 23	Fleetwood Town	3–1	Accrington Stanley	Fleetwood
15:00 GMT	Parkin 6'; Ball 58'; Carr 90+6'	Report	Odejayi 81'	Stadium: Highbury Stadium; Attendance: 2,446; Referee: Graham Salisbury

11 January 2014 24	Dagenham & Redbridge	0–1	Fleetwood Town	Dagenham, London
		Report	Ball 74'	Stadium: Victoria Road; Attendance: 1,679; Referee: Darren Sheldrake

18 January 2014 25	Fleetwood Town	2–0	Hartlepool United	Fleetwood
	Parkin 67'; Marrow 69'	Report		Stadium: Highbury Stadium; Attendance: 3,009; Referee: James Adcock

25 January 2014 26	Burton Albion	2–4	Fleetwood Town	Burton upon Trent
16:00 GMT	Roberts 50' (o.g.); Marrow 62' (o.g.)	Report	Ball 19'; Pond 51'; Parkin 78'; Brown 90+4'	Stadium: Pirelli Stadium; Attendance: 2,396; Referee: Darren Drysdale

27 January 2014 27	Scunthorpe United	0–0	Fleetwood Town	Scunthorpe
19:45 GMT		Report		Stadium: Glanford Park; Attendance: 3,005; Referee: Scott Duncan

1 February 2014 28	Fleetwood Town	1–2	York City	Fleetwood
15:00 GMT	Mandron 72'	Report	McLaughlin 45+2' (o.g.); Fletcher 90+1'	Stadium: Highbury Stadium; Attendance: 2,513; Referee: Fred Graham

11 February 2014 29	Wycombe Wanderers	1–1	Fleetwood Town	High Wycombe
19:45 GMT	Lewis 45+1'	Report	Parkin 76'	Stadium: Adams Park; Attendance: 2,185; Referee: Lee Collins

15 February 2014 30	Fleetwood Town	2–0	Northampton Town	Fleetwood
15:00 GMT	Evans 22', 79'	Report		Stadium: Highbury Stadium; Attendance: 2,521; Referee: Richard Clark

=== Football League Cup ===
7 August Round 1	Notts County	3–2	Fleetwood Town	Nottingham
19:45 BST	Showunmi 28'; Haynes 40'; McGregor 73'; Smith (yellow card) 83' (yellow-red card)	Report	16' Evans; 88' Ball	Stadium: Meadow Lane; Attendance: 2,115; Referee: Hill

=== FA Cup ===
9 November Round 1	Gloucester City	0–2	Fleetwood Town	Cheltenham
15:00 BST		Report	Ball 11'; Parkin 84'	Stadium: Whaddon Road; Attendance: 1,183; Referee: Fred Graham

7 December Round 2	Fleetwood Town	1–1	Burton Albion	Fleetwood
15:00 BST	Hughes 83'	Report	Kee 90'	Stadium: Highbury Stadium; Attendance: 2,119; Referee: Eddie Ilderton

17 December 2013 Round 2 replay	Burton Albion	1–0	Fleetwood Town	Burton upon Trent
19:45	Kee 24'	Report		Stadium: Pirelli Stadium; Attendance: 1,777; Referee: Charles Breakspear

=== Johnstone's Paint Trophy ===
3 September Round 1	Tranmere Rovers	1–2	Fleetwood Town	Tranmere
19:45 BST	Horwood 37'	Report	48', 66' Matt	Stadium: Prenton Park; Attendance: 1,937; Referee: C Boyeson

8 October Round 2	Fleetwood Town	4–0	Crewe Alexandra	Fleetwood
19:45 BST	Ball 40'; Parkin 44'; Pond 47'; Blair 90'			Stadium: Highbury Stadium; Attendance: 1,928; Referee: Eddie Ilderton

13 November Area Quarter-Finals	Fleetwood Town	2–0	Carlisle United	Fleetwood
19:45 BST	Ball 5'; Sarcevic 54'			Stadium: Highbury Stadium; Attendance: 2,446; Referee: Stuart Attwell

10 December 2013 Area semi-finals	Fleetwood Town	2–1	Rotherham United	Fleetwood
19:45 GMT	Hughes 19'; McLaughlin 70'	Report	Dicko 56'	Stadium: Highbury Stadium; Attendance: 2,224; Referee: Scott Duncan

4 February 2014 Area final	Fleetwood Town	1–3	Chesterfield	Fleetwood
19:45 GMT	Ball 45'	Report	Evatt 21'; Morsy 24'; Ryan 65'	Stadium: Highbury Stadium; Attendance: 3,508; Referee: David Coote

18 February 2014 Area final	Chesterfield	0–1 (3–2 agg.)	Fleetwood Town	Chesterfield
19:45 GMT		Report	Parkin 90'	Stadium: Proact Stadium; Attendance: 6,358; Referee: David Webb

== Overall summary ==
=== Summary ===
Games played	19 (15 League Two, 0 FA Cup, 1 League Cup, 3 League Trophy)
Games won	12 (9 League Two, 0 FA Cup, 0 League Cup, 3 League Trophy)
Games drawn	1 (1 League Two, 0 FA Cup, 0 League Cup, 0 League Trophy)
Games lost	6 (5 League Two, 0 FA Cup, 1 League Cup, 0 League Trophy)
Goals scored	24 (20 League Two, 0 FA Cup, 2 League Cup, 2 League Trophy)
Goals conceded	19 (15 League Two, 0 FA Cup, 3 League Cup, 1 League Trophy)
Goal difference	+5
Clean sheets	3 (3 League Two, 0 FA Cup, 0 League Cup, 0 League Trophy)
Yellow cards	20 (17 League Two, 0 FA Cup, 1 League Cup, 2 League Trophy)
Red cards	0 (0 League Two, 0 FA Cup, 0 League Cup, 0 League Trophy)
Worst discipline	Liam Hogan (3 (yellow card) , 0 (red card) )
Best result	4–1, vs. Torquay United, 7 September 2013
Worst result	0–2 vs. AFC Wimbledon, 31 August 2013
Most appearances	
Top scorer	Jamille Matt (6)
Points	22

=== Score overview ===
Opposition	Home score	Away score	Double
Accrington Stanley	3–1	0–2	No
Bristol Rovers	3–1	3–1	Yes
Burton Albion	2–3	4–2	No
Bury	2–1	2–2	No
Cheltenham Town	0–2	2–1	No
Chesterfield	1–1	1–2	No
Dagenham & Redbridge	3–1	1–0	Yes
Exeter City	1–2	0–3	No
Hartlepool United	2–0	1–0	Yes
Mansfield Town	5–4	0–1	No
Morecambe	2–2	0–1	No
Newport County	4–1	0–0	No
Northampton Town	2–0	0–1	No
Oxford United	1–1	2–0	No
Plymouth Argyle	0–4	2–0	No
Portsmouth	3–1	1–0	Yes
Rochdale	0–0	2–1	No
Scunthorpe United	0–1	0–0	No
Southend United	1–1	0–2	No
Torquay United	4–1	1–0	Yes
Wimbledon	0–0	0–2	No
Wycombe Wanderers	1–0	1–1	No
York City	1–2	2–0	No
