= Alex Marrow =

English footballer (born 1990)

Personal information
- Full name: Alexander James Marrow
- Date of birth: 21 January 1990 (age 36)
- Place of birth: Tyldesley, England
- Position: Defensive midfielder

Youth career
- Bolton Wanderers
- ?–2008: Blackburn Rovers

Senior career*
Years	Team	Apps	(Gls)
2008–2011	Blackburn Rovers	0	(0)
2009–2010	→ Oldham Athletic (loan)	32	(1)
2010–2011	→ Crystal Palace (loan)	17	(0)
2011–2013	Crystal Palace	10	(0)
2012	→ Preston North End (loan)	4	(0)
2012–2013	→ Fleetwood Town (loan)	20	(0)
2013–2014	Blackburn Rovers	2	(0)
2014	→ Fleetwood Town (loan)	7	(1)
2014–2015	Carlisle United	4	(0)
2015–2016	AFC Fylde	3	(0)
- * Club domestic league appearances and goals as of 00:03, 1 March 2018 (UTC)

Alexander James Marrow (born 21 January 1990) is an English professional footballer.

== Career ==
=== Blackburn Rovers (first spell, 2008–2011) ===
Marrow started his youth career at Bolton Wanderers. After leaving Bolton, Marrow joined Ashton Athletic in Division Two of the North West Counties Football League. At the time, Marrow was working as part-time plasterer in Astley, Greater Manchester. He then joined Blackburn Rovers on a contract until the end of the 2007–08 season. On 27 January 2009, Marrow signed a new contract with the club, that would expire in 2011.

In order to get first team experience, on 6 August 2009, Marrow joined Oldham Athletic on an initial one-month loan. He made his professional league debut in the 0–0 draw against Stockport County on 8 August 2009. On 22 August, Marrow scored his first goal for Oldham Athletic against Swindon Town. After making twelve starts for the club, his loan spell with Oldham Athletic was extended until the end of the season. Marrow would make thirty-three appearances in all competitions. Marrow enjoyed his time at Oldham Athletic, due to increased playing time, as well as, "getting good experience."

=== Crystal Palace ===
On 21 August 2010, Marrow signed for Crystal Palace on a six-month loan. He made his debut for the club, as Crystal Palace lost 2–1 to Ipswich Town on 21 August 2010. Under the management reign of George Burley, Marrow's first team opportunities increased and he was awarded man of the match against Queens Park Rangers and fans called for his loan spell with Crystal Palace to be extended. During his loan with the club, Marrow made 18 appearances before signing permanently for the Eagles for an undisclosed fee, on a contract until 2013.

Marrow's first game after signing for the club on a permanent basis came on 22 January 2011, in a 0–0 draw against Bristol City. However, Marrow would soon lose his first team place, sustaining an ankle injury at training after joining the club on a permanent basis. In March 2011, Marrow was out for another four weeks after sustaining an injury. Furthermore, it was later confirmed that Marrow would be out for the 2010–11 season.

In July 2011, Marrow returned to full training following his recovery from the ankle injury. In September 2011, Marrow was available to play ahead of a match against Wigan Athletic, but wasn't included in the squad. Once again, Marrow was ruled out through injury. In January 2012, Marrow was fit again, and he expected to be available for selection by the end of the month. Marrow made his first Crystal Palace appearance for a year, in a 2–1 loss against Blackpool on 21 January 2012.

On 27 January 2012, Marrow completed a season-long loan move to Football League One side Preston North End. He made his first start on 15 February 2012, as Preston beat Hartlepool United 2–1. Marrow made four appearances for Preston before he returned to Crystal Palace.

At the start of the 2012–13 season, Marrow joined Fleetwood Town on loan, though Crystal Palace website stated it will end in January. Marrow made his debut on 22 August 2012, coming on as a substitute for Jamie McGuire in the second half, as they lost 1–0 to Bradford City. Marrow then received a red card after second bookable offence, in a 0–0 draw against Rochdale on 26 October 2012. After making twenty appearances, Marrow returned to his parent club.

Marrow made his first start for Crystal Palace in two years, as they beat Charlton Athletic on 4 February 2013. However, towards the end of the season, Marrow was mainly used as a substitute, making only four appearances after his return.

=== Blackburn Rovers return ===
Sky Sports claimed that Marrow was to return to Blackburn Rovers in his second spell at the club. His return was later confirmed when he joined the club for an undisclosed fee.

He made his debut in a 1–1 draw against Derby County on the opening game of the season, where he gave away a penalty by handling in the box. Marrow would later make three appearances before joining Fleetwood Town on loan. Despite starting the season well, Marrow had his first team opportunities limited once again.

On 13 January 2014, Marrow returned to Fleetwood Town for a second loan spell with the club, until the end of the season. After joining Fleetwood Town, Marrow expressed happiness on his return and aim to play a key role for the club this season. Marrow scored on his return, in his second loan spell at Fleetwood Town, where Fleetwood Town beat Hartlepool United 2–0 on 18 January 2014. In the next match against Burton Albion, on 25 January 2014, Marrow scored an own goal, though Fleetwood Town would win 4–2. Just making seven appearances, Marrow was absent from the squad for the remainder of the season, due to illness, where the club would be promoted to League One.

Following his loan spell at Fleetwood Town, Marrow was among six players to be transfer listed ahead of a new season. On 15 July 2014, Blackburn released him by mutual consent.

=== Carlisle United ===
On 15 July 2014, the same day as his release from Blackburn, Marrow signed for League Two side Carlisle United on a one-year deal. Upon joining Carlisle United, Marrow stated his aims for the just-relegated Carlisle to bounce back to League One and for him to get increased playing time. He made his Carlisle debut in the opening match of the 2014–15 season, a 1–0 defeat to Luton Town. He was released by Carlisle halfway through the season because of a fall out with the club.

== Career statistics ==
Appearances and goals by club, season and competition
Club	Season	League			FA Cup		League Cup		Other		Total	
Club	Season	Division	Apps	Goals	Apps	Goals	Apps	Goals	Apps	Goals	Apps	Goals
Blackburn Rovers	2009–10	Premier League	0	0	0	0	0	0	0	0	0	0
Blackburn Rovers	2010–11	Premier League	0	0	0	0	0	0	0	0	0	0
Blackburn Rovers	Total		5	0	0	0	2	0	0	0	7	0
Oldham Athletic (loan)	2009–10	League One	32	1	1	0	0	0	1 (Note: Appearance(s) in Football League Trophy)	0	34	1
Crystal Palace (loan)	2010–11	Championship	17	0	0	0	1	0	0	0	18	0
Crystal Palace	2010–11	Championship	4	0	0	0	0	0	0	0	4	0
Crystal Palace	2011–12	Championship	1	0	0	0	2	0	0	0	3	0
Crystal Palace	2012–13	Championship	4	0	0	0	0	0	0	0	4	0
Crystal Palace	Total		26	0	0	0	3	0	0	0	29	0
Preston North End (loan)	2011–12	League One	4	0	0	0	0	0	0	0	4	0
Fleetwood Town (loan)	2012–13	League Two	20	0	1	0	0	0	1	0	22	0
Blackburn Rovers	2013–14	Championship	2	0	0	0	1	0	0	0	3	0
Fleetwood Town (loan)	2013–14	League Two	7	1	0	0	0	0	1	0	8	1
Carlisle United	2014–15	League Two	4	0	0	0	1	0	0	0	5	0
Career total			95	2	2	0	7	0	3	0	107	2
