= Rodrigo Branco =

Brazilian footballer

Personal information
- Full name: Rodrigo Branco Araújo
- Date of birth: 14 July 1991 (age 35)
- Place of birth: Brazil
- Height: 1.87 m (6 ft 2 in)
- Position: Forward

Youth career
- 2008: São Bernardo
- 2009: São Paulo

Senior career*
| Years | Team | Apps | (Gls) |
| 2012 | Fleetwood Town | 1 | (0) |
| 2012 | → Lancaster City (loan) | 7 | (6) |
| 2013 | Floriana | 1 | (0) |
| 2013 | Hastings United | 3 | (0) |
| 2013–2014 | Horsham | 2 | (0) |
| 2014 | Grêmio Catanduvense | 2 | (0) |
| 2015–2016 | Knoxville Force | | |
| 2016–2017 | Bangor City | 22 | (5) |
- * Club domestic league appearances and goals as of 07:10, 1 May 2017 (UTC)

Rodrigo Branco Araújo (born 14 July 1991) is a Brazilian footballer.

== Playing career ==
Branco failed a trial with Premier League club Blackburn Rovers in 2010, before leaving his native Brazil to sign with Micky Mellon's Fleetwood Town, in England's League Two. He scored six goals in eight games on loan at Northern Premier League side Lancaster City. He made his Fleetwood debut on 20 November 2012, in a 3–1 defeat to Accrington Stanley at Highbury, after replacing Curtis Obeng on 63 minutes.

=== Floriana ===
On 27 January 2013, Branco signed for Maltese Premier League side Floriana. He made just one appearance for the club, a 3–0 defeat at home to Hibernians.

=== Hastings United ===
On 4 October 2013, Branco signed for Isthmian League Division One South side Hastings United. He came off the bench in the club's 3–2 FA Trophy victory, scoring on his debut.

=== Horsham ===
On 30 November 2013, Branco moved to divisional rivals Horsham.

=== Knoxville Force ===
In 2015, Branco played for Knoxville Force.

=== Bangor City ===
In August 2016 he joined Welsh Premier League side Bangor City.

== Statistics ==
As of 10 April 2017

| Season | Club | Division | League | | State League | | National Cup | | League Cup | | Other | | Total | |
| Season | Club | Division | Apps | Goals | Apps | Goals | Apps | Goals | Apps | Goals | Apps | Goals | Apps | Goals |
|---|---|---|---|---|---|---|---|---|---|---|---|---|---|---|
| 2012–13 | Fleetwood Town | League Two | 1 | 0 | — | | 0 | 0 | 0 | 0 | 0 | 0 | 1 | 0 |
| 2012–13 | Lancaster City (loan) | Northern Premier League Division One North | 7 | 6 | — | | 0 | 0 | — | | 1 (Note: Appearance(s) in FA Trophy) | 0 | 8 | 6 |
| 2012–13 | Floriana | Maltese Premier League | 1 | 0 | — | | 0 | 0 | — | | 0 | 0 | 1 | 0 |
| 2013–14 | Hastings United | Isthmian League Division One South | 3 | 0 | — | | 0 | 0 | — | | 2 | 1 | 5 | 1 |
| 2013–14 | Horsham | Isthmian League Division One South | 2 | 0 | — | | 0 | 0 | — | | 0 | 0 | 2 | 0 |
| 2014 | Grêmio Catanduvense | Paulista A2 | — | | 2 | 0 | — | | — | | 0 | 0 | 2 | 0 |
| 2016–17 | Bangor City | Welsh Premier League | 22 | 5 | — | | 1 | 0 | 3 | 1 | 0 | 0 | 26 | 6 |
| Career total | | | 36 | 11 | 2 | 0 | 1 | 0 | 3 | 1 | 3 | 1 | 45 | 13 |
