= 2012–13 Fleetwood Town F.C. season =

Fleetwood Town
2012–13 season
- Chairman: Andrew Pilley
- Manager: Micky Mellon (till 1 December); Graham Alexander (from 6 December)
- Stadium: Highbury Stadium
- League Two: 13th
- FA Cup: Second round (eliminated by Aldershot Town)
- League Cup: First round (eliminated by Nottingham Forest)
- League Trophy: First round (eliminated by Rochdale)
- Top goalscorer: League: Junior Brown (6); All: Junior Brown (7)
- Highest home attendance: 3,624 vs. Torquay United, 18 August 2012
- Lowest home attendance: 1,696 vs Bromley, 3 November 2012
- Average home league attendance: 2,853
Home colours	Away colours

The 2012–13 season was Fleetwood Town's first in the Football League following promotion from the Football Conference the previous season.

On 1 December 2012, manager Micky Mellon was sacked following three successive defeats, with the club 7th in the league. Preston North End's head of youth development, Graham Alexander, was appointed as his replacement on 6 December.

== League Two ==
=== Standings ===
Pos	Team	Pld	W	D	L	GF	GA	GD	Pts
11	Southend United	46	16	13	17	61	55	+6	61
12	Rochdale	46	16	13	17	68	70	−2	61
13	Fleetwood Town	46	15	15	16	55	57	−2	60
14	Bristol Rovers	46	16	12	18	60	69	−9	60
15	Wycombe Wanderers	46	17	9	20	50	60	−10	60

Updated to match(es) played on 27 April 2013. Source: BBC Sport
Rules for classification: 1) Points; 2) Goal difference; 3) Number of goals scored

==== Results summary ====
Overall								Home						Away					
Pld	W	D	L	GF	GA	GD	Pts	W	D	L	GF	GA	GD	W	D	L	GF	GA	GD
29	11	11	7	39	30	+9	44	6	6	4	21	18	+3	5	5	3	18	12	+6

Last updated: 5 February 2013.

Round	1	2	3	4	5	6	7	8	9	10	11	12	13	14	15	16	17	18	19	20	21	22	23	24	25	26	27	28	29	30	31	32	33	34	35	36	37	38	39	40	41	42	43	44	45	46
Ground	H	A	A	H	A	H	H	A	H	A	A	H	H	A	A	H	A	H	H	A	H	A	H	H	A	A	H	H	H																	
Result	D	L	W	W	W	W	D	W	W	D	L	D	W	D	D	D	W	L	L	D	D	W	D	W	L	L	W	D																		
Position	11	18	13	8	4	3	4	5	3	3	3	4	3	3	4	4	5	4	4	6	8	8	7	8		6	7	8	8	9																

== Squad ==
Note: Flags indicate national team as defined under FIFA eligibility rules; some limited exceptions apply. Players may hold more than one non-FIFA nationality.

No.	Pos.	Nation	Player
1	GK	ENG	Scott Davies
2	DF	ENG	Shaun Beeley
3	DF	ENG	Dean Howell
4	MF	ENG	Anthony Barry
6	MF	ENG	Nathan Pond (on loan at Grimsby Town)
7	MF	ENG	Danny Rose (on loan at Aldershot Town)
8	MF	ENG	Jamie Milligan
9	FW	ENG	Jon Parkin
10	FW	ENG	Jamille Matt
11	MF	SCO	Barry Nicholson
12	DF	ENG	Junior Brown
13	DF	ENG	Alan Goodall
14	FW	ENG	Andy Mangan
15	DF	NIR	Conor McLaughlin
16	GK	WAL	Chris Maxwell
17	FW	WAL	Alex Titchiner
18	MF	ENG	Jamie McGuire

No.	Pos.	Nation	Player
19	FW	ENG	Steven Gillespie
20	MF	NIR	Damien Johnson
21	FW	ENG	Jamie Allen
22	MF	ENG	Liam Wynn
23	DF	ENG	Kieran Charnock (on loan at Macclesfield Town)
24	FW	ENG	Ryan Crowther (on loan at Hyde)
25	DF	ENG	Rob Atkinson
26	FW	ENG	David Ball
28	DF	FRA	Youl Mawéné
29	FW	ENG	Ritchie Allen
30	FW	ENG	Danny Rowe (on loan at Barrow)
32	MF	ENG	Gareth Evans
33	GK	ENG	David Lucas
34	FW	BRA	Rodrigo Branco
35	MF	CAN	Mozesh Gyorio
37	MF	ENG	Paul McKenna (on loan from Hull City)

=== Statistics ===
As of 22 May 2013

No.	Pos	Nat	Player	Total		League Two		FA Cup		League Cup		League Trophy	
No.	Pos	Nat	Player	Apps	Goals	Apps	Goals	Apps	Goals	Apps	Goals	Apps	Goals
1	GK	(England) ENG	Scott Davies	49	0	45+0	0	2+0	0	1+0	0	1+0	0
2	DF	(England) ENG	Shaun Beeley	37	0	34+0	0	1+0	0	1+0	0	1+0	0
3	DF	(England) ENG	Dean Howell	33	1	30+0	1	1+1	0	1+0	0	0+0	0
4	MF	(England) ENG	Anthony Barry	12	0	9+3	0	0+0	0	0+0	0	0+0	0
5	FW	(France) FRA	Jean-Michel Fontaine	12	0	4+8	0	0+0	0	0+0	0	0+0	0
6	MF	(England) ENG	Nathan Pond	11	0	10+1	0	0+0	0	0+0	0	0+0	0
8	MF	(England) ENG	Jamie Milligan	11	0	3+5	0	0+2	0	0+0	0	0+1	0
9	FW	(England) ENG	Jon Parkin	24	12	14+8	10	1+0	2	1+0	0	0+0	0
10	FW	(England) ENG	Jamille Matt	14	3	11+3	3	0+0	0	0+0	0	0+0	0
11	MF	(Scotland) SCO	Barry Nicholson	32	2	17+12	2	1+0	0	1+0	0	1+0	0
12	DF	(England) ENG	Junior Brown	45	11	40+3	10	2+0	1	0+0	0	0+0	0
13	DF	(England) ENG	Alan Goodall	31	3	28+1	3	1+0	0	0+0	0	1+0	0
14	FW	(England) ENG	Andy Mangan	14	4	7+5	4	0+0	0	1+0	0	1+0	0
15	DF	(Northern Ireland) NIR	Conor McLaughlin	21	0	13+6	0	1+0	0	1+0	0	0+0	0
16	GK	(Wales) WAL	Chris Maxwell	0	0	0+0	0	0+0	0	0+0	0	0+0	0
17	FW	(Wales) WAL	Alex Titchiner	10	0	3+6	0	0+0	0	0+0	0	0+1	0
18	MF	(England) ENG	Jamie McGuire	40	3	34+3	1	0+1	0	1+0	0	1+0	2
19	FW	(England) ENG	Steven Gillespie	24	4	9+12	4	0+1	0	0+1	0	1+0	0
20	MF	(Northern Ireland) NIR	Damien Johnson	23	0	17+5	0	1+0	0	0+0	0	0+0	0
21	FW	(England) ENG	Jamie Allen	4	1	2+2	1	0+0	0	0+0	0	0+0	0
22	MF	(England) ENG	Liam Wynn	0	0	0+0	0	0+0	0	0+0	0	0+0	0
23	DF	(England) ENG	Kieran Charnock	3	0	1+2	0	0+0	0	0+0	0	0+0	0
24	MF	(England) ENG	Ryan Crowther	15	2	8+7	2	0+0	0	0+0	0	0+0	0
25	DF	(England) ENG	Rob Atkinson	19	0	18+0	0	0+0	0	0+0	0	1+0	0
26	FW	(England) ENG	David Ball	38	9	28+6	7	2+0	2	1+0	0	1+0	0
27	DF	(England) ENG	Ryan Edwards (on loan from Blackburn Rovers)	9	0	9+0	0	0+0	0	0+0	0	0+0	0
28	DF	(France) FRA	Youl Mawéné	21	0	19+0	0	1+0	0	1+0	0	0+0	0
29	FW	(England) ENG	Ritchie Allen	0	0	0+0	0	0+0	0	0+0	0	0+0	0
32	MF	(England) ENG	Gareth Evans	16	1	13+3	1	0+0	0	0+0	0	0+0	0
33	GK	(England) ENG	David Lucas	2	0	1+1	0	0+0	0	0+0	0	0+0	0
34	FW	(Brazil) BRA	Rodrigo Branco	1	0	0+1	0	0+0	0	0+0	0	0+0	0
35	MF	(Canada) CAN	Mozesh Gyorio	1	0	0+1	0	0+0	0	0+0	0	0+0	0
37	MF	(England) ENG	Paul McKenna (on loan from Hull City)	15	0	15+0	0	0+0	0	0+0	0	0+0	0
Players currently out on loan:
7	MF	(England) ENG	Danny Rose	0	0	0+0	0	0+0	0	0+0	0	0+0	0
30	FW	(England) ENG	Danny Rowe	0	0	0+0	0	0+0	0	0+0	0	0+0	0
Players who have left the club with appearances:
5	DF	(England) ENG	Steve McNulty	18	2	15+0	2	1+1	0	1+0	0	0+0	0
10	MF	(Wales) WAL	Lee Fowler	13	1	11+0	1	1+0	0	0+1	0	0+0	0
27	MF	(England) ENG	Alex Marrow (on loan from Crystal Palace)	22	0	13+7	0	1+0	0	0+0	0	1+0	0
32	FW	(England) ENG	Thomas Barkhuizen (on loan from Blackpool)	13	1	8+4	1	1+0	0	0+0	0	0+0	0
33	DF	(England) ENG	Ashley Eastham (on loan from Blackpool)	2	0	1+0	0	0+0	0	0+0	0	1+0	0
33	DF	(Wales) WAL	Rob Edwards (on loan from Barnsley)	5	0	4+0	0	1+0	0	0+0	0	0+0	0
35	DF	(Wales) WAL	Curtis Obeng (on loan from Swansea City)	6	0	4+1	0	1+0	0	0+0	0	0+0	0
37	MF	(Scotland) SCO	Barry Ferguson (on loan from Blackpool)	8	0	6+0	0	2+0	0	0+0	0	0+0	0

==== Goalscorers ====
Rank	No.	Pos.	Name	League Two	FA Cup	League Cup	League Trophy	Total
1	9	FW	Jon Parkin	10	2	0	0	12
2	12	DF	Junior Brown	10	1	0	0	11
3	26	FW	David Ball	7	2	0	0	9
4	19	FW	Steven Gillespie	5	0	0	0	5
5	13	DF	Alan Goodall	4	0	0	0	4
5	14	FW	Andy Mangan	4	0	0	0	4
7	10	FW	Jamille Matt	3	0	0	0	3
7	18	MF	Jamie McGuire	1	0	0	2	3
9	5	DF	Steve McNulty	2	0	0	0	2
9	11	MF	Barry Nicholson	2	0	0	0	2
9	Own Goals			2	0	0	0	2
12	3	DF	Dean Howell	1	0	0	0	1
12	21	FW	Jamie Allen	1	0	0	0	1
12	24	DF	Ryan Crowther	2	0	0	0	2
12	~~32~~	FW	Thomas Barkhuizen	1	0	0	0	1
12	32	MF	Gareth Evans	1	0	0	0	1
Total				50	5	0	2	58

==== Disciplinary record ====
No.	Pos.	Name	League Two		FA Cup		League Cup		League Trophy		Total	
No.	Pos.	Name	Booked	Sent off (straight red)	Booked	Sent off (straight red)	Booked	Sent off (straight red)	Booked	Sent off (straight red)	Booked	Sent off (straight red)
1	GK	Scott Davies	4	1	0	0	0	0	1	0	5	1
2	DF	Shaun Beeley	4	0	0	0	0	0	0	0	4	0
3	DF	Dean Howell	4	1	0	0	0	0	0	0	4	1
4	MF	Anthony Barry	1	0	0	0	0	0	0	0	1	0
~~5~~	DF	Steve McNulty	2	0	0	0	0	0	0	0	2	0
5	FW	Jean-Michel Fontaine	1	0	0	0	0	0	0	0	1	0
6	MF	Nathan Pond	2	1	0	0	0	0	0	0	2	1
8	MF	Jamie Milligan	1	0	0	0	0	0	0	0	1	0
9	FW	Jon Parkin	6	0	0	0	0	0	0	0	6	0
~~10~~	MF	Lee Fowler	1	0	1	0	0	0	0	0	2	0
10	FW	Jamille Matt	1	0	0	0	0	0	0	0	1	0
11	MF	Barry Nicholson	7	0	0	0	0	0	0	0	7	0
12	DF	Junior Brown	8	0	0	0	0	0	0	0	8	0
13	DF	Alan Goodall	6	1	0	0	0	0	0	0	6	1
14	FW	Andy Mangan	3	0	0	0	0	0	0	0	3	0
15	DF	Conor McLaughlin	3	0	0	0	0	0	0	0	3	0
18	MF	Jamie McGuire	8	1	0	0	1	0	0	0	9	1'
19	FW	Steven Gillespie	1	0	0	0	0	0	0	0	1	0
20	MF	Damien Johnson	2	0	0	0	0	0	0	0	2	0
25	DF	Rob Atkinson	4	0	0	0	0	0	0	0	4	0
26	FW	David Ball	2	0	0	0	0	0	0	0	2	0
~~27~~	MF	Alex Marrow	4	1	0	0	0	0	0	0	4	1
27	DF	Ryan Edwards	2	0	0	0	0	0	0	0	2	0
28	DF	Youl Mawéné	3	0	1	0	0	0	0	0	4	0
~~32~~	FW	Thomas Barkhuizen	1	0	0	0	0	0	0	0	1	0
32	MF	Gareth Evans	1	0	0	0	0	0	0	0	1	0
~~33~~	DF	Rob Edwards	1	0	0	0	0	0	0	0	1	0
~~35~~	DF	Curtis Obeng	1	0	0	0	0	0	0	0	1	0
~~37~~	MF	Barry Ferguson	3	0	0	0	0	0	0	0	3	0
37	MF	Paul McKenna	3	1	0	0	0	0	0	0	3	1
Total			89	7	2	0	1	0	1	0	93	7

== Transfers ==
=== In ===
No.	Pos.	Nat.	Name	Age	EU	Moving from	Type	Transfer window	Ends	Transfer fee	Source
16	GK	(Wales)	Chris Maxwell	21	EU	Wrexham (Wales)	Free Transfer	Summer	Undisclosed	Free	
17	FW	(Wales)	Alex Titchiner	18	EU	Witton Albion	Free Transfer	Summer	Undisclosed	Free	
3	DF	(England)	Dean Howell	31	EU	Crawley Town	Free Transfer	Summer	2014	Free	
20	MF	(Northern Ireland)	Damien Johnson	33	EU	Plymouth Argyle	Free Transfer	Summer	Undisclosed	Free	
9	FW	(England)	Jon Parkin	30	EU	Cardiff City (Wales)	Free Transfer	Summer	2013	Free	
19	FW	(England)	Steven Gillespie	26	EU	Colchester United	Transfer	Summer	Undisclosed	Undisclosed	
11	MF	(Scotland)	Barry Nicholson	33	EU	Preston North End	Free Transfer	Summer	2013	Free	
15	DF	(Northern Ireland)	Conor McLaughlin	20	EU	Preston North End	Free Transfer	Summer	Undisclosed	Free	
26	FW	(England)	David Ball	22	EU	Peterborough United	Transfer	Summer	2015	Undisclosed	
28	DF	(France)	Youl Mawéné	33	EU	Aberdeen (Scotland)	Free Transfer	Summer	2014	Free	
32	MF	(England)	Gareth Evans	24	EU	Rotherham United	Transfer	Winter	2013	Free	
33	GK	(England)	David Lucas	35	EU	Birmingham City	Transfer	Winter	2014	Undisclosed	
35	MF	(Canada)	Mozzi Gyorio	23	EU	Free agent	Free Transfer	Winter	2013	Free	
10	FW	(England)	Jamille Matt	22	EU	Kidderminster Harriers	Transfer	Winter	2014	£200,000	
5	FW	(Réunion)	Jean-Michel Fontaine	24	EU	Free agent	Free Transfer	Winter	2013	Free	

=== Loans in ===
No.	Pos.	Name	Country	Age	Loan club	Started	Ended	Start source	End source
27	MF	Alex Marrow	(England)	36	Crystal Palace	17 August			
32	FW	Thomas Barkhuizen	(England)	19	Blackpool	29 August	4 January		
33	DF	Ashley Eastham	(England)	21	Blackpool	29 August	29 September		
33	DF	Rob Edwards	(Wales) (England)	29	Barnsley	10 October	9 November		
35	DF	Curtis Obeng	(Wales)	23	Swansea City	25 October	26 December		
37	MF	Barry Ferguson	(Scotland)	34	Blackpool	2 November	4 January		
37	MF	Paul McKenna	(England)	48	Hull City	25 January	10 May		
27	DF	Ryan Edwards	(England)	19	Blackburn Rovers	21 February	10 May		

Sources: For loan start source see "Start source". For loan end source see "End source".
EU = if holds or not a European Union passport; Country: when 2 flags, 1st flag = country that plays for internationally, 2nd flag = country of birth; No. = number on jersey; P = Position (for position name, pause mouse pointer on abbreviation); Name = Name on jersey (for more extensive name, pause mouse pointer on name); In/Out = In: The player came in on loan, Out: The player went out on loan; Loan club = the club that the player moved on loan to or the club that the player came from on loan; Started = the date when the player's loan started; Ended = the date when the player's loan ended.

=== Out ===
No.	Pos.	Name	Country	Age	Type	Moving to	Transfer window	Transfer fee	Apps	Goals	Source
7	DF	Sean Clancy	(England)	24	Contract Ended	Chester	Summer	Free	87	26	
21	MF	Jack Duggan	(England)	-	Contract Ended		Summer	Free	0	0	
3	DF	Paul Edwards	(England)	32	Contract Ended		Summer	Free	7	0	
28		Matthew Flynn	(England)	22	Contract Ended	Barrow	Summer	Free	3	0	
24	DF	Matty Hughes	(England)	-	Contract Ended		Summer	Free	1	0	
20	DF	Paul Linwood	(England)	28	Contract Ended	Chester	Summer	Free	21	0	
19	FW	Gareth Seddon	(England)	31	Contract Ended	Halifax Town	Summer	Free	80	34	
34	GK	Stevenson	(England)	-	Contract Ended		Summer	Free	0	0	
11	MF	Peter Till	(England)	26	Contract Ended	Tamworth	Summer	Free	18	1	
10	FW	Magno Vieira	(Brazil)	27	Contract Ended	Forest Green Rovers	Summer	Free	64	31	
33	FW	Jamie Vardy	(England)	25	Transfer	Leicester City	Summer	£1,000,000	40	34	
26	DF	Peter Cavanagh	(England)	30	Free Transfer	Rochdale	Summer	Free	39	3	
15	MF	Briggs	(England)	30	Free Transfer	Kidderminster Harriers	Summer	Free	18	1	
10	MF	Lee Fowler	(Wales)	29	Transfer	Doncaster Rovers	Winter	Undisclosed	31	0	
5	DF	Steve McNulty	(England)	29	Transfer	Luton Town	Winter	Free	105	3	

EU = if holds or not a European Union passport; Country: when 2 flags, 1st flag = country that plays for internationally, 2nd flag = country of birth; N = number on jersey; P = Position (for position name, pause mouse pointer on abbreviation); Name = Name on jersey (for more extensive name, pause mouse pointer on name); Age = age on the day of the signing; Moving from = only indicate the club the player was playing before start playing for this club in this season, for the type of the moving see Status column; Moving to = only indicates the club the player is going to play next, for the type of the moving see Status column; Ends = when the player's current contract ends; n/a = Not applicable; Apps = Total number of competitive appearances (including substitute appearances) at the club prior to departure; Goals = Total number of competitive goals scored at the club prior to departure.

=== Loans Out ===
No.	Pos.	Name	Country	Age	Loan club	Started	Ended	Start source	End source
30	FW	Danny Rowe	(England)	–	Stockport County	20 July			
23	DF	Kieran Charnock	(England)	28	Macclesfield Town	1 August	1 January		
6	MF	Nathan Pond	(England)	28	Grimsby Town	10 August	5 January		
24	MF	Ryan Crowther	(England)	24	Hyde	29 August	1 January		
25	DF	Atkinson	(England)	26	Accrington Stanley	21 September	28 November		
7	MF	Danny Rose	(England)	24	Aldershot Town	10 October	10 January		
17	FW	Alex Titchiner	(Wales)	22	Halifax Town	26 October	26 November		

Sources: For loan start source see "Start source". For loan end source see "End source".
EU = if holds or not a European Union passport; Country: when 2 flags, 1st flag = country that plays for internationally, 2nd flag = country of birth; No. = number on jersey; P = Position (for position name, pause mouse pointer on abbreviation); Name = Name on jersey (for more extensive name, pause mouse pointer on name); In/Out = In: The player came in on loan, Out: The player went out on loan; Loan club = the club that the player moved on loan to or the club that the player came from on loan; Started = the date when the player's loan started; Ended = the date when the player's loan ended.

== Fixtures and Results ==
=== Pre–season ===
18 July 2012	Fleetwood Town	0–1	Gateshead	Fleetwood
14:00			Hatch 15'	Stadium: Highbury Stadium

21 July 2012	Fleetwood Town	0–2	Blackburn Rovers	Fleetwood
12:00			Formica 8'; Nuno Gomes 47'	Stadium: Highbury Stadium

27 July 2012	Fleetwood Town	1–3	Oldham Athletic	Fleetwood
19:30	Mangan 62'		Furman 17', 27'; Simpson 31'	Stadium: Highbury Stadium

=== League Two ===
18 August 2012	Fleetwood Town	0–0	Torquay United	Fleetwood
15:00				Stadium: Higbury; Attendance: 3,624

21 August 2012	Bradford City	1–0	Fleetwood Town	Bradford
19:45	Hanson 59'			Stadium: Valley Parade; Attendance: 9,224

25 August 2012	Burton Albion	0–1	Fleetwood Town	Burton-on-Trent
15:00			47' Howell	Stadium: Pirelli Stadium; Attendance: 2,349

1 September 2012	Fleetwood Town	4–1	Aldershot Town	Fleetwood
15:00	Brown 26', 81'; Howell (red card) 30'; McNulty 47'; Mangan 90'		37' (o.g.) Davies; (yellow card) 75' (yellow-red card) Payne	Stadium: Highbury Stadium; Attendance: 2,510

8 September 2012	Morecambe	0–4	Fleetwood Town	Morecambe
15:00			21', 50', 76' Parkin; 84' Nicholson	Stadium: Globe Arena; Attendance: 3,232

15 September 2012	Fleetwood Town	1–0	Northampton Town	Fleetwood
15:00	Mangan 90+3'		(yellow card) 23' (yellow-red card) East	Stadium: Highbury Stadium; Attendance: 3,027

18 September 2012	Fleetwood Town	2–5	Port Vale	Fleetwood
19:45	Brown 39'; Gillespie 84' (pen.)		29', 60' Pope; 34' Vincent; 67', 78' Dodds	Stadium: Highbury Stadium; Attendance: 3,392

22 September 2012	Bristol Rovers	0–0	Fleetwood Town	Bristol
15:00				Stadium: Memorial Stadium; Attendance: 5,079

29 September 2012	Fleetwood Town	2–1	Barnet	Fleetwood
15:00	Ball 26' (pen.); Barkhuizen 78'		5' Hyde; (red card) 23' Stack	Stadium: Highbury Stadium; Attendance: 3,615

2 October 2012	York City	0–2	Fleetwood Town	York
19:45			36' Brown; 87' Gillespie	Stadium: Bootham Crescent; Attendance: 3,084

6 October 2012	Cheltenham Town	2–2	Fleetwood Town	Cheltenham
15:00	Goulding 64'; Jombati 74'; Bennett (red card)		32' Ball; 90' Brown	Stadium: Whaddon Road; Attendance: 2,702

13 October 2012	Fleetwood Town	0–1	Wycombe Wanderers	Fleetwood
15:00			9' Andrade	Stadium: Highbury Stadium; Attendance: 3,612

20 October 2012	Fleetwood Town	1–1	AFC Wimbledon	Fleetwood
15:00	Gillespie 10'		62' Harrison	Stadium: Highbury Stadium; Attendance: 2,547

23 October 2012	Chesterfield	1–2	Fleetwood Town	Chesterfield
19:45	Darikwa 44'		6' Gillespie; 90' Atkinson	Stadium: Proact Stadium; Attendance: 4,372

27 October 2012	Rochdale	0–0	Fleetwood Town	Rochdale
15:00				Stadium: Spotland Stadium; Attendance: 2,372

6 November 2012	Fleetwood Town	1–1	Rotherham United	Fleetwood
19:45	Parkin 21'		19' Árnason	Stadium: Highbury Stadium; Attendance: 2,498

10 November 2012	Exeter City	2–2	Fleetwood Town	Exeter
15:00	Cureton 24'; O'Flynn 57' (pen.)		13' McNulty; 41' Nicholson	Stadium: St James Park; Attendance: 3,540

17 November 2012	Fleetwood Town	3–0	Plymouth Argyle	Fleetwood
15:00	Ball 2'; Nelson 83' (o.g.); Brown 90'		(yellow card) 76' (yellow-red card) 78'	Stadium: Highbury Stadium; Attendance: 2,657

20 November 2012	Fleetwood Town	1–3	Accrington Stanley	Fleetwood
19:45	McGuire 67'		9' (pen.) Beattie; 17' Miller; 62' Boco	Stadium: Highbury Stadium; Attendance: 2,472

24 November 2012	Dagenham & Redbrdige	1–0	Fleetwood Town	London
15:00	Williams 90' (pen.)			Stadium: Victoria Road; Attendance: 1,618

8 December 2012	Fleetwood Town	0–0	Southend United	Fleetwood
15:00				Stadium: Highbury Stadium; Attendance: 2,399

15 December 2012	Gillingham	2–2	Fleetwood Town	Gillingham
15:00	Lee 42'; Weston 65'		20' Brown; 28' Goodall	Stadium: Priestfield Stadium; Attendance: 8,571

22 December 2012	Oxford United	P–P	Fleetwood Town	Oxford
15:00				Stadium: Kassam Stadium

26 December 2012	Fleetwood Town	1–0	Morecambe	Fleetwood
15:00	Ball 69'			Stadium: Highbury Stadium; Attendance: 3,477

29 December 2012	Fleetwood Town	0–0	York City	Fleetwood
15:00				Stadium: Highbury Stadium; Attendance: 2,465

1 January 2013	Port Vale	0–2	Fleetwood Town	Stoke-on-Trent
15:00			26' Ball; 39' Goodall	Stadium: Vale Park; Attendance: 6,082

5 January 2013	Northampton Town	3–1	Fleetwood Town	Northampton
15:00	Robinson 7', 41'; Platt 53'		90' Allen	Stadium: Sixfields Stadium; Attendance: 4,381

12 January 2013	Fleetwood Town	0–3	Bristol Rovers	Fleetwood
15:00			5' Woodards; 27' Richards; 49' O'Toole	Stadium: Highbury Stadium; Attendance: 2,811

19 January 2013	Barnet	P–P	Fleetwood Town	London
15:00				Stadium: Underhill Stadium

26 January 2013	Fleetwood Town	3–0	Oxford United	Fleetwood
15:00	Matt 9'; Crowther 58'; Parkin 86'			Stadium: Highbury Stadium; Attendance: 2,461

2 February 2013	Fleetwood Town	2–2	Bradford City	Fleetwood
15:00	Goodall 23'; Parkin 75' (pen.)		45' Wells; 52' Dickinson	Stadium: Highbury Stadium; Attendance: 3,577

9 February 2013	Torquay United	0–1	Fleetwood Town	Torquay
15:00			26' Parkin	Stadium: Plainmoor; Attendance: 2,207

12 February 2013	Oxford United	1–2	Fleetwood Town	Oxford
19:45	Davis 89'		28' Crowther; 55' Brown	Stadium: Kassam Stadium; Attendance: 5,0003

16 February 2013	Fleetwood Town	0–4	Burton Albion	Fleetwood
15:00	Davies (red card) 57'		59' (pen.), 87' Maghoma; 76' Kee; 90' Zola	Stadium: Highbury Stadium; Attendance: 2,698

23 February 2013	Aldershot Town	2–0	Fleetwood Town	Aldershot
15:00	Hylton 38', 84'		(yellow card) 29' (yellow-red card) 76' Goodall; (red card) 64' McGuire	Stadium: Recreational Ground; Attendance: 2,032

26 February 2013	Fleetwood Town	1–1	Cheltenham Town	Fleetwood
19:45	Brown 69'		24' Pack	Stadium: Highbury Stadium; Attendance: 2,031

2 March 2013	Wycombe Wanderers	1–0	Fleetwood Town	High Wycombe
15:00	Stewart 90'			Stadium: Adams Park; Attendance: 3,162

9 March 2013	Fleetwood Town	0–0	Exeter City	Fleetwood
15:00				Stadium: Highbury Stadium; Attendance: 2,097

12 March 2013	Accrington Stanley	0–3	Fleetwood Town	Accrington
19:45			25', 62', 70' Parkin	Stadium: Crown Ground; Attendance: 1,388

16 March 2013	Plymouth Argyle	2–1	Fleetwood Town	Plymouth
15:00	Wotton 25' (pen.); Banton 39'		75' Ball; (red card) 85' McKenna	Stadium: Home Park; Attendance: 6,776

19 March 2013	Barnet	2–0	Fleetwood Town	London
19:45	Byrne 23'; Gambin 60'			Stadium: Underhill Stadium; Attendance: 1,731

23 March 2013	Fleetwood Town	2–1	Dagenham & Redbridge	Fleetwood
15:00	Brown 6'; Evans 52'		5' (pen.) Elito	Stadium: Highbury Stadium; Attendance: 2,019

30 March 2013	Fleetwood Town	2–2	Gillingham	Fleetwood
15:00	Matt 33', 69'		3' Kedwell; 43' Allen	Stadium: Highbury Stadium; Attendance: 3,033

1 April 2013	Southend United	1–1	Fleetwood Town	Southend-on-Sea
13:00	Corr 86'		2' Goodall	Stadium: Roots Hall; Attendance: 5,107

6 April 2013	Fleetwood Town	0–3	Rochdale	Fleetwood
15:00	Pond (red card) 81'		9' Henderson; 61' Donnelly; 89' Kennedy	Stadium: Highbury Stadium; Attendance: 2,954

13 April 2013	Rotherham United	2–1	Fleetwood Town	Rotherham
15:00	Nardiello 3'; Agard 62'		6' Ball	Stadium: New York Stadium; Attendance: 7,360

20 April 2013	Fleetwood Town	1–3	Chesterfield	Fleetwood
15:00	Managan 68'		44' Gnanduillet; 45', 64' Richards	Stadium: Highbury Stadium; Attendance: 3,705

27 April 2013	AFC Wimbledon	2–1	Fleetwood Town	London
15:00	Alexander 61'; Midson 72' (pen.)		64' Managan	Stadium: Kingsmeadow; Attendance: 4,738

=== FA Cup ===
3 November 2012 First round	Fleetwood Town	3–0	Bromley	Fleetwood
15:00	Ball 11'; Parkin 17' (pen.), 34' (pen.)			Stadium: Highbury Stadium; Attendance: 1,696

1 December 2012 Second round	Fleetwood Town	2–3	Aldershot Town	Fleetwood
19:45	Brown 11'; Ball 88'		19', 75' Hylton; 45' Vincenti	Stadium: Highbury Stadium; Attendance: 1,757

=== League Cup ===
13 August 2012 First round	Fleetwood Town	0–1	Nottingham Forest	Fleetwood
19:45			57' Blackstock	Stadium: Highbury Stadium; Attendance: 3,611

=== League Trophy ===
4 September 2012 First round	Rochdale	2–2 (a.e.t.) (4–2 p)	Fleetwood Town	Rochdale
19:45	Grant 26' (pen.); Putterill 58'		64', 72' McGuire	Stadium: Spotland Stadium; Attendance: 1,256
	Penalties
	Putterill (penalty scored); Tutte (penalty missed); P Edwards (penalty scored); McIntyre (penalty scored); Grant (penalty scored)		(penalty scored) Milligan; (penalty missed) Mangan; (penalty missed) McGuire; (penalty scored) Nicholson
