= Alex Titchiner =

Welsh footballer

Personal information
- Full name: Alexander Mark Titchiner
- Date of birth: 13 June 1991 (age 35)
- Place of birth: St Asaph, Wales
- Position: Forward

Youth career
- Crewe Alexandra

Senior career*
Years	Team	Apps	(Gls)
2009–2010	Crewe Alexandra	0	(0)
2009	→ Chasetown (loan)	1	(0)
2010	→ Colwyn Bay (loan)		
2010	→ Colwyn Bay (loan)		
2010–2011	Colwyn Bay		
2010	→ Chester (loan)	4	(0)
2011	→ Witton Albion (loan)	8	(6)
2011–2012	Witton Albion	41	(27)
2012–2014	Fleetwood Town	9	(0)
2012	→ FC Halifax Town (loan)	3	(4)
2013	→ FC Halifax Town (loan)	17	(7)
2013–2014	→ Chester (loan)	15	(0)
2014	Witton Albion		
2014–2016	Conwy Borough		
2016–2019	Rhyl		
2019–2020	Flint Town United		
- * Club domestic league appearances and goals

Alexander Mark Titchiner (born 13 June 1991) is a Welsh retired footballer who played forward.

== Career ==
Born in St Asaph, Titchiner began his career at Crewe Alexandra; he turned professional at the start of the 2009–10 season, and joined Chasetown on loan in October 2009. He also spent two loan spells at Colwyn Bay during the 2009–10 season, first joining in January and then in March.

In August 2010 he joined Colwyn Bay after his release from Crewe. In October, he joined Chester on loan for a month.

He joined Witton Albion on loan in January 2011, scoring six goals in eight games. He returned to the team at Colwyn Bay on his return, before making the move to Witton Albion permanent in August. He scored 44 goals in all competitions for Witton during the 2011–12 season. He subsequently moved Fleetwood Town in May 2012, signing a two-year professional contract.

He made his debut for Fleetwood on 4 September 2012 as a substitute in a Football League Trophy match against Rochdale and followed this up with his Football League debut on 8 September as a late substitute in a match against Morecambe.

On 26 October 2012 he joined FC Halifax Town on loan for a month. He made his club debut the following day in a league match against Brackley Town. His time with club saw him score a second half hat-trick in a 4–1 victory over Droylsden. before he was recalled to his parent club prior to the end of his agreed loan period. Titchiner returned to Halifax Town on loan in February 2013. Titchiner scored on his second debut for Halifax, in a 3–3 draw with Histon.

He moved on loan to Chester in July 2013.

On 30 January 2014, Titchiner was released from Fleetwood Town, and later rejoined Witton Albion.

He then played in Wales for Conwy Borough, Rhyl and Flint Town United.

== Career statistics ==
As of 11 March 2016

Appearances and goals by club, season and competition
Club	Season	League			FA Cup		League Cup		Other		Total	
Club	Season	Division	Apps	Goals	Apps	Goals	Apps	Goals	Apps	Goals	Apps	Goals
Chasetown (loan)	2009–10	NPL Division One South	1	0	0	0	0	0	2 (Note: Appearances in FA Trophy)	0	3	0
Chester (loan)	2010–11	NPL Division One North	4	0	—		0	0	3 (Note: Two appearances in President's Cup, one appearance in Cheshire Senior Cup)	0	7	0
Witton Albion (loan)	2010–11	NPL Division One North	8	6	0	0	0	0	0	0	8	6
Witton Albion	2011–12	NPL Division One North	41	27	5	4	4	4	7 (Note: Four appearances and three goals in FA Trophy, one appearance in Cheshire Senior Cup, two appearances and two goals in NPL Division One North play-offs)	5	57	40
Fleetwood Town	2012–13	League Two	9	0	0	0	0	0	1 (Note: Appearances in Football League Trophy)	0	10	0
Fleetwood Town	2013–14	League Two	0	0	0	0	0	0	0	0	0	0
Fleetwood Town	Total		9	0	0	0	0	0	1	0	10	0
FC Halifax Town (loan)	2012–13	Conference North	20	11	0	0	—		1 (Note: Appearances in FA Trophy)	0	21	11
Chester (loan)	2013–14	Conference Premier	15	0	1	0	—		1 (Note: Appearances in FA Trophy)	0	17	0
Witton Albion	2013–14	NPL Premier Division	22	11	0	0	1	0	0	0	23	11
Witton Albion	2014–15	NPL Premier Division	43	5	1	0	2	2	5 (Note: Three appearances and one goal in FA Trophy, one appearance in Cheshire Senior Cup, one appearance and one goal in Mid-Cheshire Senior Cup.)	2	51	9
Witton Albion	2015–16	NPL Division One North	20	7	3	1	1	0	4 (Note: Three appearances in FA Trophy, one appearance in Cheshire Senior Cup)	0	28	8
Witton Albion	Total		85	23	4	1	4	2	9	2	102	28
Career total			183	67	10	5	8	6	24	7	225	85
