= Jamille Matt =

Jamaican footballer (born 1989)

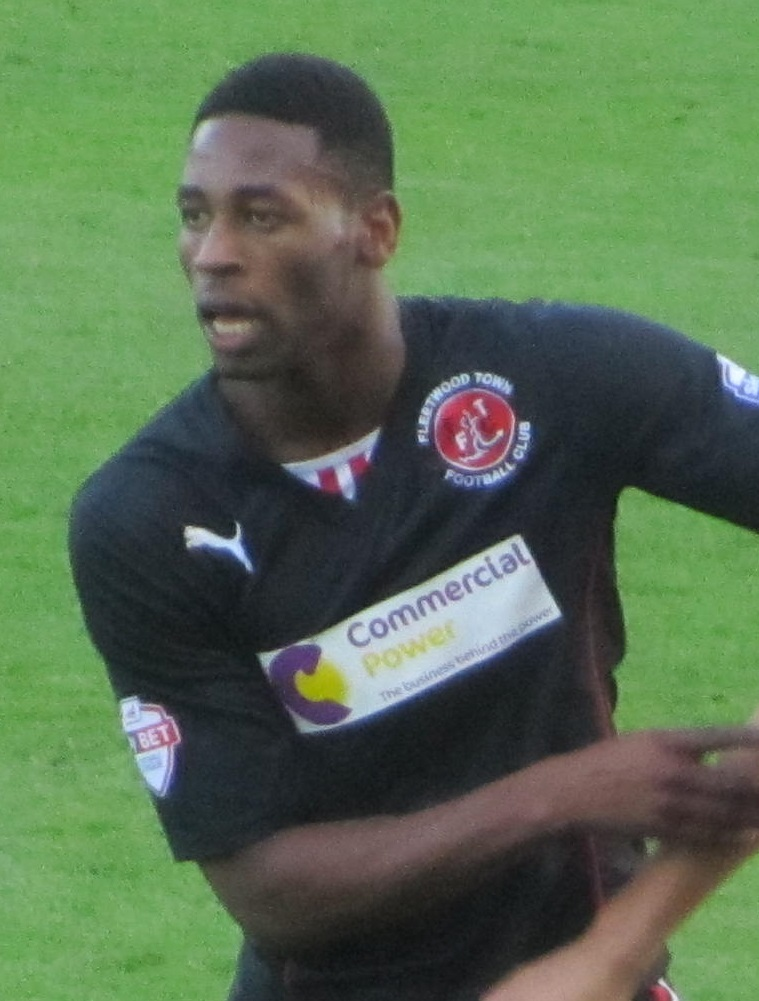
- Matt playing for Fleetwood Town in 2013

Personal information
- Full name: Jamille Antonio Matt
- Date of birth: 20 October 1989 (age 37)
- Place of birth: Jamaica
- Height: 1.85 m (6 ft 1 in)
- Position: Forward

Team information
- Current team: Bromsgrove Sporting

Senior career*
Years	Team	Apps	(Gls)
- Sutton Coldfield Town
2010–2013	Kidderminster Harriers	62	(22)
2013–2016	Fleetwood Town	56	(14)
2015–2016	→ Stevenage (loan)	8	(1)
2016	→ Plymouth Argyle (loan)	11	(5)
2016–2018	Blackpool	32	(3)
2017–2018	→ Grimsby Town (loan)	34	(4)
2018–2020	Newport County	76	(20)
2020–2023	Forest Green Rovers	98	(36)
2023–2026	Walsall	120	(21)
2026–	Bromsgrove Sporting	0	(0)
- * Club domestic league appearances and goals as of 22:04, 10 March 2026 (UTC)

Jamille Antonio Matt (born 20 October 1989) is a Jamaican professional footballer who plays as a forward for Southern Football League Premier Division Central club Bromsgrove Sporting.

Matt began his career at Sutton Coldfield Town, before moving to Kidderminster Harriers in 2010. He spent three seasons at the club, before moving to Fleetwood Town in January 2013. He signed on loan for Stevenage in November 2015, and for Plymouth Argyle in March 2016. He moved to Blackpool in June 2016. He spent the 2017–18 on loan at Grimsby Town, before signing for Newport County in June 2018.

== Club career ==
Born in Jamaica, Matt moved from Sutton Coldfield Town to Kidderminster Harriers in November 2010 on non-contract terms, following a trial earlier in that month. Matt signed a contract with Kidderminster in May 2011. In March 2012 there were issues with Matt's work permit, and he was granted a period of leave from the club. Matt returned to first-team action in November 2012. Matt won the Conference Premier Player of the Month Award in December 2012, and he signed a new 18-month contract in January 2013.

=== Fleetwood Town ===
Later that month, Fleetwood Town broke their club record transfer fee to sign Matt. In November 2013 the club announced that Matt would be ruled out for a month with an ankle injury.

Matt was part of Fleetwood's 2013–14 team that beat Burton Albion 1–0 in the 2014 Football League Two play-off final at Wembley Stadium, seeing Fleetwood promoted into League One for the first time in their entire history.

In August 2014 it was announced that Matt would miss the entire 2014–15 season due to injury. In May 2015 it was announced that Matt would be offered a new contract by the club.

He signed a two-month loan deal with Stevenage in November 2015.

He signed a 28-day loan deal with Plymouth Argyle in March 2016.

=== Blackpool ===
After his release by Fleetwood, Matt signed for Blackpool in June 2016. Matt scored his first goal for Blackpool in an FA Cup tie against former club Kidderminster Harriers on 6 November 2016.

After tearing his hamstring on 17 April 2017 in a 1–0 victory over Doncaster Rovers, Matt missed the remainder of the 2016–17 season. Blackpool eventually went on to beat Exeter City 2–1 in the 2017 EFL League Two play-off final at Wembley Stadium, seeing Blackpool promoted back into League One after one season.

On 29 August 2017, Matt joined League Two side Grimsby Town on loan until end of season. He was released by Blackpool at the end of the 2017–18 season.

=== Newport County ===
On 20 June 2018, Matt joined Newport County on a two-year contract. He made his debut on 4 August in a 3–0 defeat to Mansfield Town, scoring his first goal ten days later in a 4–1 win versus Cambridge United in the EFL Cup. On 6 January 2019, he scored the first goal in Newport's 2–1 FA Cup win over Premier League side Leicester City. He was part of the team that reached the League Two playoff final at Wembley Stadium on 25 May 2019. Newport lost 1–0 to Tranmere Rovers after a goal in the 119th minute. Matt was released by Newport County at the end of the 2019–20 season due to the club's Coronavirus pandemic financial concerns.

=== Forest Green Rovers ===
Matt signed for Forest Green Rovers on 20 July 2020 on a one-year deal. On 31 December 2020, having scored 9 goals in 23 appearances, Matt exercised his option to extend his contract by a further year.

In April 2021, he was nominated for the EFL League Two Player of the Season.

Matt was appointed as club captain for the 2021–22 season.

=== Walsall ===
On 13 January 2023, Matt signed an 18-month contract with EFL League Two side Walsall, after joining for an undisclosed fee. On 18 May 2024, he signed a new one-year contract.

On 26 June 2025, the club announced he had signed a new one-year contract.

He was released by Walsall at the end of the 2025–26 season.

=== Later career ===
On 12 June 2026, it was announced that Matt would join Southern League Premier Division Central club Bromsgrove Sporting following his release from Walsall.

== International career ==
Matt was called up to the England C squad in February 2012 for the International Challenge Trophy Group ‘A’, but he was unable to play due to issues with his work permit which also affected his club career with Kidderminster Harriers around the same time.

== Career statistics ==
As of match played on 10 March 2026

Appearances and goals by club, season and competition
Club	Season	League			FA Cup		League Cup		Other		Total	
Club	Season	Division	Apps	Goals	Apps	Goals	Apps	Goals	Apps	Goals	Apps	Goals
Kidderminster Harriers	2010–11	Conference Premier	22	3	0	0	0	0	0	0	22	3
Kidderminster Harriers	2011–12	Conference Premier	32	11	3	0	0	0	4 (Note: Appearance(s) in FA Trophy)	3	39	14
Kidderminster Harriers	2012–13	Conference Premier	8	8	0	0	0	0	2	0	10	8
Kidderminster Harriers	Total		62	22	3	0	0	0	6	3	71	25
Fleetwood Town	2012–13	League Two	14	3	0	0	0	0	0	0	14	3
Fleetwood Town	2013–14	League Two	25	8	0	0	1	0	2 (Note: Appearance(s) in Football League Trophy)	2	28	10
Fleetwood Town	2014–15	League One	0	0	0	0	0	0	0	0	0	0
Fleetwood Town	2015–16	League One	17	3	1	0	0	0	2	0	20	3
Fleetwood Town	Total		56	14	1	0	1	0	4	2	62	16
Stevenage (loan)	2015–16	League Two	8	1	0	0	0	0	0	0	8	1
Plymouth Argyle (loan)	2015–16	League Two	11	5	0	0	0	0	3 (Note: Three appearances and two goals in League Two play-offs)	2	14	7
Blackpool	2016–17	League Two	32	3	4	2	1	0	1	0	38	5
Blackpool	2017–18	League One	0	0	0	0	1	0	0	0	1	0
Blackpool	Total		32	3	4	2	2	0	1	0	39	3
Grimsby Town (loan)	2017–18	League Two	34	4	1	0	1	0	1	0	37	4
Newport County	2018–19	League Two	43	14	7	3	2	1	5	2	57	20
Newport County	2019–20	League Two	33	6	4	0	0	0	3	0	39	6
Newport County	Total		76	20	11	3	3	1	8	2	98	26
Forest Green Rovers	2020–21	League Two	36	16	0	0	1	0	3 (Note: One appearance in EFL Trophy; two appearances and one goal in play-offs)	1	40	17
Forest Green Rovers	2021–22	League Two	46	19	0	0	2	1	1	0	49	20
Forest Green Rovers	2022–23	League One	16	1	1	0	1	0	2	1	20	2
Forest Green Rovers	Total		98	36	1	0	4	1	6	2	109	39
Walsall	2022–23	League Two	13	2	0	0	0	0	0	0	13	2
Walsall	2023–24	League Two	38	5	1	1	0	0	1	0	40	6
Walsall	2024–25	League Two	43	12	2	0	2	0	6 (Note: Three appearances in the EFL Trophy, three appearances in the play-offs)	0	53	12
Walsall	2025–26	League Two	26	2	3	1	1	0	4	0	34	3
Walsall	Total		120	21	6	2	3	0	11	0	140	23
Career total			497	126	27	7	13	2	40	11	577	146

== Honours ==
Fleetwood Town

- Football League Two play-offs: 2014

Forest Green Rovers

- EFL League Two: 2021–22

Individual

- Forest Green Rovers Player of the Year: 2020–21
- PFA Fans' Player of the Year: 2021–22 League Two
- PFA Team of the Year: 2021–22 League Two
