= Ryan Crowther =

British footballer (born 1988)

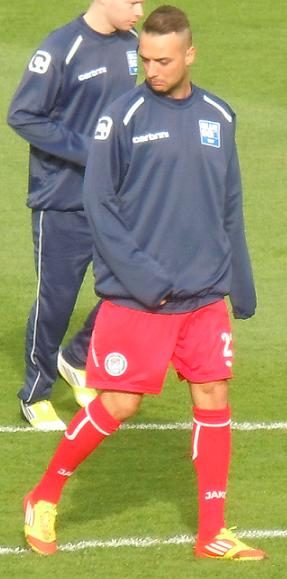
- Crowther playing for Hyde

Personal information
- Full name: Ryan John Crowther
- Date of birth: 17 September 1988 (age 38)
- Place of birth: Stockport, England
- Height: 5 ft 11 in (1.80 m)
- Position: Winger

Youth career
- 1997–2006: Stockport County

Senior career*
Years	Team	Apps	(Gls)
2006–2007	Stockport County	2	(0)
2007–2009	Liverpool	0	(0)
2010	Stalybridge Celtic	2	(0)
2011	Ashton United	22	(3)
2011	Hyde United	15	(7)
2011–2014	Fleetwood Town	19	(2)
2012	→ Hyde United (loan)	12	(2)
2012–2013	→ Hyde United (loan)	18	(4)
2014	FC Halifax Town	14	(2)
2014–2016	Altrincham	15	(3)
2016–2019	Ashton United		
2019	Hyde United	1	(0)
- * Club domestic league appearances and goals as of 17:29, 27 April 2015 (UTC)

Ryan John Crowther (born 17 September 1988) is a former English professional footballer who lasted played for Hyde as a winger. He started his career with his local side Stockport County, where he stayed for 10 years before moving to Liverpool in 2007. After spending two years at Liverpool, he left by mutual consent having made no first team appearances.

Crowther went on several trials before joining Stalybridge Celtic in August 2010. He left the club in September, having been sentenced to four months in prison, for a drunken attack on a taxi driver in Watford. After his release from prison he joined Ashton United, where he stayed until the end of the 2010–11 season, before Hyde, and later Fleetwood Town. Following his release from Fleetwood, Crowther joined non-League side FC Halifax Town. At the end of the 2013–14 season he left Halifax after just 4 months at the club.

== Career ==
=== Stockport County and Liverpool ===
Born in Stockport, Greater Manchester, Crowther spent nine years at his local club Stockport County moving through the youth system, before making his first team debut for the club on 2 January 2006 in a 2–2 draw against Cheltenham Town, where aged just 17, he came on as a substitute and was made captain, making him the youngest captain in the club's history. He went on to make one other senior appearance for Stockport before the club were approached by Liverpool requesting an opportunity to take both Crowther and Greg Tansey on trial with a view to take them to a tournament in Milan, and agreed deals with Stockport for both players subject to satisfactory performances from the players at the tournament. The players both went to the tournament and Crowther joined Liverpool on 9 July 2007, with Tansey deciding to stay at Stockport. Crowther featured for the successful Liverpool reserve team during the 2007–08 season. On 18 August 2009, it was confirmed that he had left Liverpool by mutual consent.

Crowther playing for Ashton United in 2011

Just one week after leaving Liverpool he went on trial at AFC Bournemouth. He also returned to Stockport where he played in a pre-season friendly but was not offered a contract. In October 2009 he went on trial with Grimsby Town but again was not offered a contract.

=== Drop into non-League ===
After several trials, he joined Stalybridge Celtic in August 2010, making his debut for the club on 28 of that month in a Conference North match against Nuneaton Town. After just one more appearance, as a substitute, in a 1–0 defeat to Harrogate Town, he left the club to serve four months in prison after being convicted of assault. On his release from prison, he joined Northern Premier League outfit Ashton United. He scored his first goal for the club, in a Manchester Premier Cup game against Irlam Town, which Crowther's side won 7–0. He scored his first league goal for the club on the following weekend, as his side were beaten 6–3 by Frickley Athletic. He played 25 games in the 2010–11 season in total, scoring four goals. However, Crowther joined Ashton's neighbours Hyde in June 2011. He made his debut on the opening day of the 2011–12 season as his side beat Worcester City 2–1, Crowther scored the opening goal. He scored one more goal in August as Hyde came out as 4–0 winners over Hinckley United. Crowther played a total of 17 games, in which he scored nine goals, during his short spell with Hyde.

=== Fleetwood Town ===
On 18 November 2011, he left Hyde in order to join Conference National club Fleetwood Town on a free transfer. He made his Fleetwood debut a day later as a second-half substitute as his side beat Crowther's former team Stockport 2–1.

In January 2012 he returned to former club Hyde on a three-month loan, with a recall possible after 28 days. He returned to Fleetwood after playing 14 games scoring two goals, and he played in Fleetwood's game against Cambridge United, in which they lost. He re-joined Hyde on loan for the second time, in August 2012. Making his third debut for the club away at Forest Green Rovers, scoring in a 3–1 defeat. He scored the winner for Hyde in October as his side won 1–0 away at Cambridge United. He scored twice in two games in November scoring in a 3–2 win over Grimsby Town, and a 3–2 defeat at Ebbsfleet United respectively. He returned to Fleetwood in January 2013 playing 18 times scoring four times in his third spell with the club.

He made a goal scoring return for Fleetwood, scoring on his first game after returning from Hyde, in a 3–0 win over Oxford United. He scored his second goal for the club again against Oxford United three games later. He finished the 2012–13 season having played 18 times scoring four goals for Hyde, and 15 games scoring two goals for Fleetwood.

On 30 January 2014, Crowther was released from Fleetwood Town.

=== FC Halifax Town ===
Following his release from Fleetwood, Crowther joined Conference Premier side FC Halifax Town. Crowther scored on his Halifax debut in the 3–1 away defeat to Lincoln City on 1 February 2014.

In March 2019 he rejoined Hyde.

== Personal life ==
In an interview with Liverpool Football Club, he stated that if he wasn't a footballer he would have been a physio. On 12 September 2010, he was jailed for four months over a drunken attack on a taxi driver which had taken place on 9 August 2009 in Watford, Hertfordshire. He was tried for racially aggravated assault occasioning actual bodily harm but a jury acquitted him of that charge, but found him guilty of an alternative charge of assaulting the taxi driver.

== Career statistics ==
As of 11 February 2014

Club	Season	League^{[A]}		FA Cup		League Cup		Other^{[B]}		Total	
Club	Season	Apps	Goals	Apps	Goals	Apps	Goals	Apps	Goals	Apps	Goals
Stockport County	2005–06	1	0	0	0	0	0	0	0	1	0
Stockport County	2006–07	1	0	0	0	0	0	0	0	1	0
Stockport County	Total	2	0	0	0	0	0	0	0	2	0
Liverpool	2007–08	0	0	0	0	0	0	0	0	0	0
Liverpool	2008–09	0	0	0	0	0	0	0	0	0	0
Liverpool	2009–10	0	0	0	0	0	0	0	0	0	0
Liverpool	Total	0	0	0	0	0	0	0	0	0	0
Stalybridge Celtic	2010–11	2	0	0	0	0	0	0	0	2	0
Ashton United	2010–11	22	3	0	0	0	0	3	1	25	4
Hyde	2011–12	15	7	2	2	0	0	0	0	17	9
Fleetwood Town	2011–12	2	0	0	0	0	0	1	0	3	0
Fleetwood Town	2012–13	15	2	0	0	0	0	0	0	15	2
Fleetwood Town	2013–14	1	0	0	0	0	0	0	0	1	0
Fleetwood Town	Total	18	2	0	0	0	0	1	0	19	2
Hyde (loan)	2012–13	12	4	0	0	0	0	0	0	12	4
Hyde (loan)	2012–13	18	4	0	0	0	0	0	0	18	4
FC Halifax Town	2013–14	2	1	0	0	0	0	0	0	2	1
Career total		91	21	2	2	0	0	4	1	97	24

A. The "League" column constitutes appearances and goals (including those as a substitute) in the Football League, Football Conference and Northern Premier League.
B. The "Other" column constitutes appearances and goals (including those as a substitute) in the FA Trophy and Regional cup competitions.
