= Jon Parkin =

English footballer (born 1981)

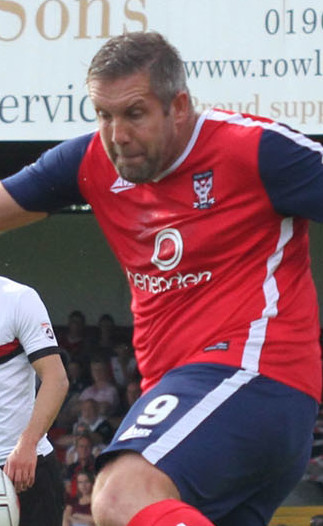
- Parkin playing for York City in 2017

Personal information
- Full name: Jonathan Parkin
- Date of birth: 30 December 1981 (age 44)
- Place of birth: Barnsley, England
- Height: 6 ft 4 in (1.93 m)
- Position: Striker

Youth career
- –1998: Barnsley

Senior career*
Years	Team	Apps	(Gls)
1998–2002	Barnsley	10	(0)
2001–2002	→ Hartlepool United (loan)	1	(0)
2002	→ York City (loan)	5	(1)
2002–2004	York City	69	(13)
2004–2006	Macclesfield Town	65	(30)
2006–2007	Hull City	47	(11)
2007	→ Stoke City (loan)	6	(3)
2007–2008	Stoke City	29	(2)
2008	→ Preston North End (loan)	1	(0)
2008–2011	Preston North End	100	(28)
2011–2012	Cardiff City	11	(1)
2011	→ Doncaster Rovers (loan)	5	(0)
2011–2012	→ Huddersfield Town (loan)	3	(0)
2012	→ Scunthorpe United (loan)	14	(6)
2012–2014	Fleetwood Town	53	(17)
2014–2016	Forest Green Rovers	84	(38)
2016–2017	Newport County	10	(4)
2016–2017	→ York City (loan)	4	(0)
2017–2019	York City	69	(36)
Total		586	(190)
- * Club domestic league appearances and goals

Jonathan Parkin (born 30 December 1981) is an English former professional footballer who played as a striker.

He came through the youth academy at hometown club Barnsley signing professional terms in 1998 but would only feature in 10 league games. Parkin played extensively in all Football League divisions, and (excluding loan spells) made more than 50 league appearances for each of four clubs: York City, Macclesfield Town, Preston North End and Fleetwood Town, plus over 50 non-League appearances for Forest Green Rovers. While never making a Premier League appearance, he also played for Stoke City during their stint in top flight football. He also played in the Football League with Hull City, Cardiff City, Doncaster Rovers, Huddersfield Town, Scunthorpe United and Newport County.

Since February 2019, Parkin has co-hosted the podcast Undr the Cosh with his former Preston North End teammate Chris Brown and comedy writer Chris J. Brown. The show has received over one million downloads and has raised money for various charities, including £1,200 raised for Prostate Cancer UK following a 145-mile bike ride in June 2019.

== Career ==
=== Early career ===
Born in Barnsley, South Yorkshire, Parkin progressed through the youth system of his hometown club Barnsley playing as both a defender and a striker. He made his reserve-team debut against Coventry City, and apparently he almost missed this game as he had forgotten about the recent rule change that had increased the number of substitutes from three to five: as he knew he would not be among the three substitutes likely to be used in the match, he took the afternoon off to eat fish and chips and have sex with a woman he knew. After 13 appearances for Barnsley, he moved to Hartlepool on loan before making a permanent move to Terry Dolan's York City.

=== Macclesfield Town ===
Parkin scored 15 goals in 87 appearances for York, despite sometimes playing in a central defensive role. After nearly two years with the club, he moved to Macclesfield Town in February 2004, after York told him they would not be able to offer him the same pay deal for the 2004–05 season. In 2004–05, he scored 26 goals in all competitions for the team, which was a new club record. By this time he was playing solely as a forward.

=== Hull City ===
At the start of 2005–06, Parkin had an injury to his knee which stopped him from playing until October 2005. Macclesfield confirmed they had rejected two bids for Parkin by 5 January 2006, but Championship club Hull City eventually signed him for an undisclosed fee on an 18-month contract on 12 January. He marked his debut with a goal against Crystal Palace, in a match that Hull were defeated 2–1. He finished 2005–06 with five goals in 18 appearances for Hull. This, along with his towering position upfront, helped Hull City stay clear of the relegation zone, finishing in 18th place and avoiding relegation by 10 points. In the opening month of 2006–07, he was the only Hull City player to score in the league, with three goals in their first five matches.

=== Stoke City ===
Parkin was loaned out to Stoke City in March 2007 for the remainder of 2006–07. He made his debut in a 2–1 victory over Southampton. He was recalled by Hull on 10 April 2007 after making six appearances and scoring three goals for Stoke. On 20 June 2007, Parkin signed for Stoke permanently for an initial fee of £275,000, which could have risen to £450,000, depending on his and Stoke's success.

=== Preston North End ===
He joined Preston North End on an emergency loan on 30 August 2008, which would be turned into a permanent three-year contract for an undisclosed fee on 1 September. He made his debut on the day he joined the club as the team beat Charlton Athletic 2–1. His first goal came after heading in a Ross Wallace cross against Doncaster Rovers in the 82nd minute on 9 December, which sealed a 1–0 victory. He followed this up with the winner against second-place Birmingham City, after Wallace set him up to score from six yards out. He also went on to score in the Boxing Day win over Derby County following another cross from Wallace. He scored Preston's first goal in a 2–1 victory over Queens Park Rangers with a 37th-minute goal, which saw Preston secure their place in the 2008–09 Championship play-offs. On 2 January 2010, Parkin scored his first FA Cup hat-trick for Preston in their 7–0 win over Colchester United. On 28 September, Parkin scored his second hat-trick for the club, and his first at Championship level, in a 6–4 win at Leeds United.

=== Cardiff City ===
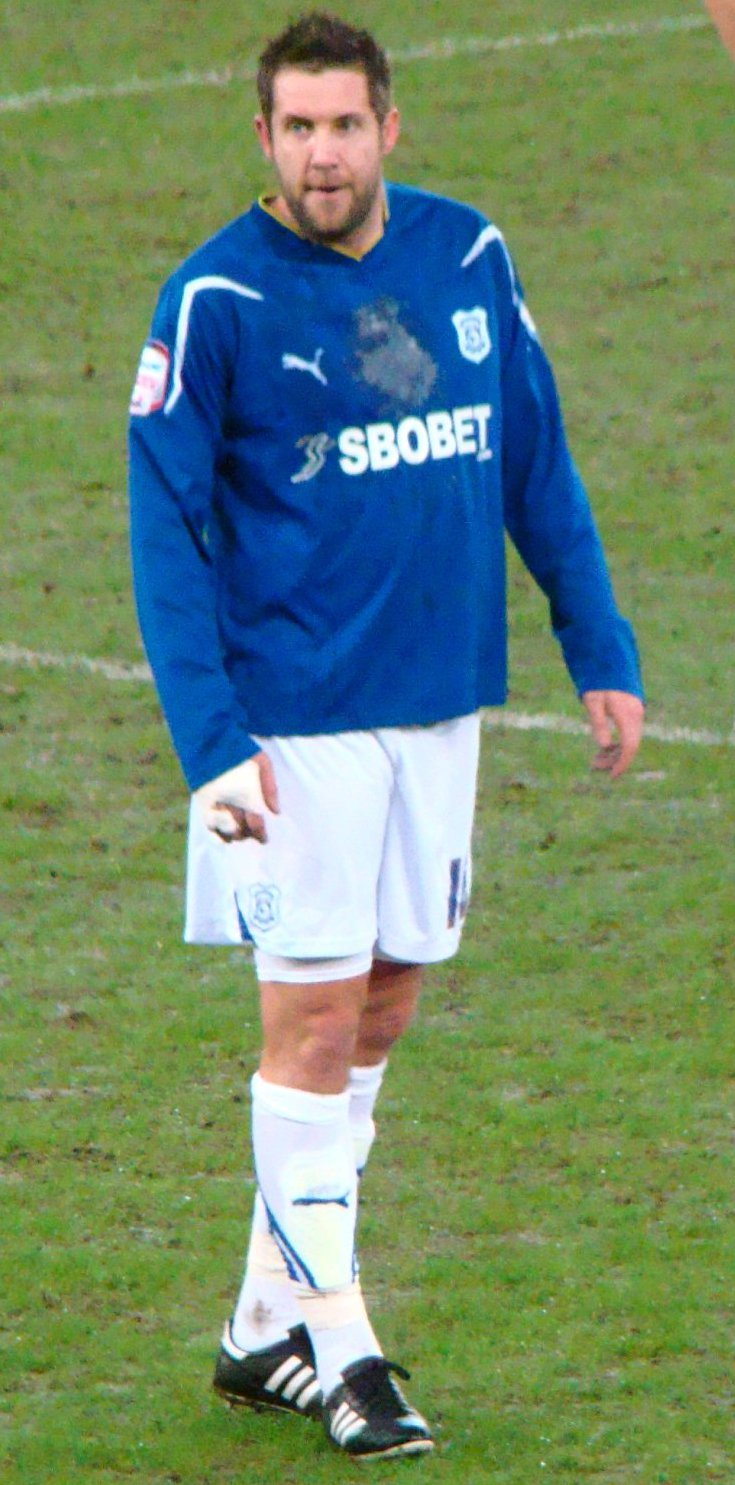
Parkin playing for Cardiff City in 2011

On 1 January 2011, Parkin signed for Championship club Cardiff City on a two-and-a-half-year contract for an undisclosed fee. He missed three matches due to injury but scored on his debut with a volley against Norwich City in a match that ended 1–1. After Jay Bothroyd's return to the team, Parkin was relegated to the bench for the majority of the remaining season. His next start came against Stoke City at Cardiff City Stadium on 18 January 2011 but he failed to make an impact.

Parkin managed to find himself on the bench at the start of 2011–12, making his first appearance against Oxford United in the first round of the League Cup on 10 August 2011 and scored his first goal of the campaign in the second round against Huddersfield Town. Parkin arrived at Coventry City for a medical and to discuss personal terms. However, the move fell through on deadline day after Parkin was reported to have failed his medical at the club. There were also reports suggesting that the Sky Blues' were unwilling to meet his £9,000 per week wage demands, with Parkin refusing to take a pay-cut despite being told by Cardiff manager Malky Mackay that he was surplus to requirements at Cardiff. He was then made available for loan.

Parkin joined Championship rivals Doncaster Rovers on loan on 21 September 2011. He made his debut on 24 September, in Doncaster's first victory of the season against Crystal Palace. Parkin returned to Cardiff on 24 October, after five appearances. Doncaster twice tried to extend his loan deal, but Cardiff rejected the bids. Instead, Parkin joined League One club Huddersfield Town on loan, making his debut on 28 November against Charlton Athletic. He returned to Cardiff on 23 January 2012 after making three appearances for Huddersfield and eight days later he joined Scunthorpe United, again on loan. He made his debut on 14 February 2012 against Rochdale and scored his first goal in a 3–1 win over Leyton Orient four days later. His loan was extended until the end of the season in March 2012. Parkin mutually agreed to terminate his contract with Cardiff on 7 June 2012, becoming a free agent.

=== Fleetwood Town ===
Parkin moved to League Two club Fleetwood Town on a free transfer on 13 June 2012. He made his first appearance for the club in a League Cup defeat against Nottingham Forest on 13 August 2012. His first league appearance came on the opening day of the 2012–13 League Two season on 18 August 2012 in a home goalless draw against Torquay United.

He scored his first goals for Fleetwood with a hat-trick in a 4–0 away victory over Morecambe on 8 September 2012. He scored one other hat-trick that season in a 3–0 away success against Accrington Stanley on 12 March 2013.

He signed a new one-year contract to stay at Fleetwood for 2013–14. He helped the club to the League Two play-offs. A win at Wembley Stadium against Burton Albion in the 2014 League Two play-off final on 26 May 2014 secured promotion into League One. Despite having helped Fleetwood to promotion, he was let go by the club in June 2014.

=== Forest Green Rovers ===
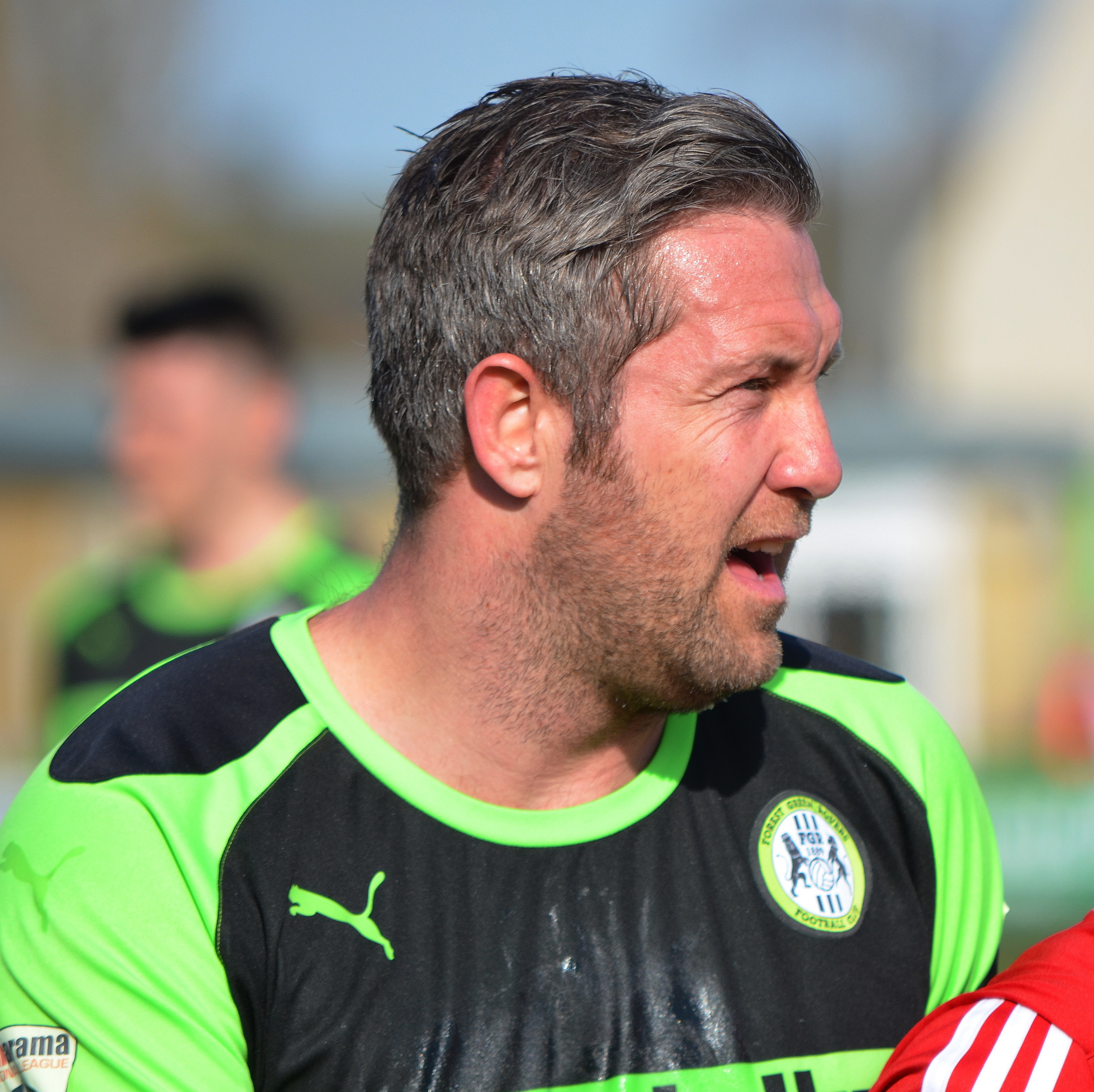
Parkin playing for Forest Green Rovers in 2016

On 21 July 2014, Parkin signed a one-year contract with Conference Premier club Forest Green Rovers. He made his debut for the club on 9 August 2014, starting and playing 75 minutes in a 1–0 away win at Southport. He then scored his first goal for the club three days later with a second half strike in a 2–1 win over Chester. Parkin scored his first hat-trick for Forest Green in an FA Trophy first round replay win against Didcot Town on 16 December 2014. And he then scored twice on 1 January 2015 in a New Year's Day 4–2 away win over Kidderminster Harriers. He followed that brace with another three days later on 4 January 2015 in a 4–1 win over Welling United.

On 6 February 2015, he was named the Conference Premier January Player of the Month after he scored seven times in just four matches in the first month of 2015. On 6 April 2015, he scored twice in a 4–1 away win over Chester. Five days later, on 11 April 2015, he scored with a shot from the halfway line against his former club Macclesfield Town in a 3–1 win. On 18 April 2015, he scored twice in a 4–2 away win over Gateshead which saw him reach the 30 goal mark in all competitions for the season. He was a part of the Forest Green team who reached the Conference Premier play-offs for the first time at the end of 2014–15, however a 3–0 aggregate victory saw Bristol Rovers progress to the play-off final. In June 2015, he was named in the Conference Premier Team of the Year for 2014–15.

On 8 August 2015, he scored the only goal in a 1–0 away win over Altrincham on the opening day of the 2015–16 National League season. His goal in a 1–0 victory over Braintree Town on 23 January 2016 saw him become Forest Green's fourth highest goal scorer of all time at National League level. He was a part of the Forest Green team that reached the 2016 National League play-off final at Wembley Stadium on 15 May 2016, coming on as a substitute at half time in a 3–1 loss to Grimsby Town that denied the club promotion to the Football League. On 6 July 2016, it was announced that Parkin and Forest Green had come to an agreement to terminate his contract by mutual consent.

=== Newport County ===
Following his release, Parkin agreed terms with National League club Barrow but later withdrew from signing for the club after interest from League Two club Newport County, signing a one-year contract with the club on 17 July 2016. Parkin made his debut for Newport on 16 August 2016 in a 2–1 away defeat to Luton Town as a 69th-minute substitute. He scored his first goal for Newport on 27 August 2016 in a 2–2 away draw against Hartlepool. He scored on 27 minutes after controlling the ball with his chest, turning and shooting on goal.

=== Return to York City ===
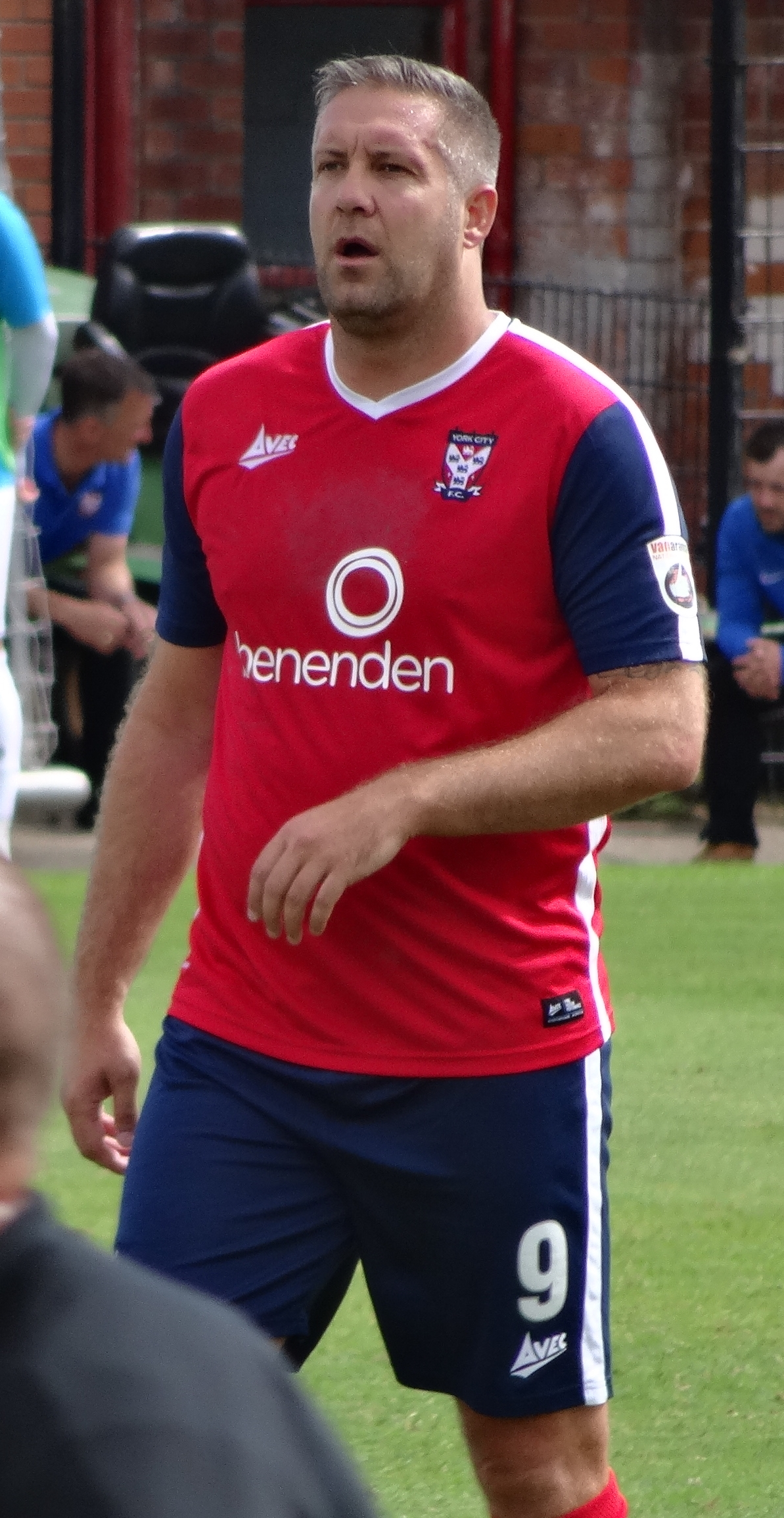
Parkin playing for York City in 2017

On 30 November 2016, Parkin rejoined York City, now in the National League, on loan until 1 January 2017. The loan would then become permanent until the end of 2016–17, with the option of a further year. He made his second debut for York after starting in their 1–0 away defeat to Tranmere Rovers on 3 December 2016; this result saw York drop to the bottom of the National League table. He started up front alongside fellow debutant Rhys Murphy, and Dave Flett of The Press commented that the pair "played with an intelligence, hunger and confidence so rarely seen from their attacking predecessors in City shirts for several years". Parkin scored the first goal of his second spell with York in the following match, a 3–1 home win over Worcester City in the FA Trophy first round on 10 December 2016, with a 10-yard shot in the 14th minute. He was ever-present for York in his loan spell, signing permanently on 6 January 2017. On 21 May 2017, Parkin started as York beat Macclesfield Town 3–2 at Wembley Stadium in the 2017 FA Trophy Final, scoring on eight minutes with a glancing header from Danny Holmes' cross. He was released by York at the end of the 2018–19 season. Parkin announced his retirement from playing on 2 August 2019.

== Style of play and personality ==
Parkin has been referred to as "The Beast" and fans have chanted "Feed the Beast and he will score". He is renowned for his large stature (quadruple XL size shirt) and an unusual unathletic lifestyle which includes never going to the gym and not having a diet, eating large portions instead (for example: for lunch; tuna crunch sandwich, a bag of crisps, a pepperoni pizza, a steak bake and either a bacon and cheese turnover or a sausage bean and cheese melt; having a full English breakfast before training).

Parkin is also known for his pranks and misadventures. On transfer deadline day while playing for Preston, he covertly changed his own name in teammate Chris Sedgwick's mobile phone contact list to the name of Sedgwick's agent, before repeatedly calling from his own phone (now listed as Sedgwick's agent in the phone). Sedgwick became excited that a big transfer move was imminent, before calling his "agent" back and hearing Parkin's mobile phone ringing on the other side of the room. In another caper, while on pre-season training for Stoke City, Parkin drove a golf buggy as fast as possible down a hill before losing control. Parkin bailed before impact but teammate Steve Simonsen remained in the buggy as it crashed heavily, rolling over twice. Parkin had to pay £1,200 for damage to the buggy.

== Personal life ==
Parkin currently co-hosts the football podcast Undr the Cosh with former Preston North End teammate Chris Brown and comedy writer Chris J. Brown.

== Career statistics ==
Appearances and goals by club, season and competition
Club	Season	League			FA Cup		League Cup		Other		Total	
Club	Season	Division	Apps	Goals	Apps	Goals	Apps	Goals	Apps	Goals	Apps	Goals
Barnsley	1998–99	First Division	2	0	0	0	0	0	—		2	0
Barnsley	1999–2000	First Division	0	0	1	0	1	0	0	0	2	0
Barnsley	2000–01	First Division	4	0	0	0	0	0	—		4	0
Barnsley	2001–02	First Division	4	0	0	0	1	0	—		5	0
Barnsley	Total		10	0	1	0	2	0	0	0	13	0
Hartlepool United (loan)	2001–02	Third Division	1	0	—		—		—		1	0
York City	2001–02	Third Division	18	2	—		—		—		18	2
York City	2002–03	Third Division	41	10	2	0	0	0	1 (Note: Appearance(s) in Football League Trophy)	1	44	11
York City	2003–04	Third Division	15	2	0	0	0	0	1	0	16	2
York City	Total		74	14	2	0	0	0	2	1	78	15
Macclesfield Town	2003–04	Third Division	12	1	—		—		—		12	1
Macclesfield Town	2004–05	League Two	42	22	3	1	1	1	5 (Note: Three appearances and two goals in Football League Trophy, two appearances in League Two play-offs)	2	51	26
Macclesfield Town	2005–06	League Two	11	7	2	0	0	0	2	2	15	9
Macclesfield Town	Total		65	30	5	1	1	1	7	4	78	36
Hull City	2005–06	Championship	18	5	—		—		—		18	5
Hull City	2006–07	Championship	29	6	2	1	3	0	—		34	7
Hull City	Total		47	11	2	1	3	0	—		52	12
Stoke City (loan)	2006–07	Championship	6	3	—		—		—		6	3
Stoke City	2007–08	Championship	29	2	2	0	1	0	—		32	2
Stoke City	2008–09	Premier League	0	0	—		1	1	—		1	1
Stoke City	Total		35	5	2	0	2	1	—		39	6
Preston North End	2008–09	Championship	39	11	1	0	—		2 (Note: Appearance(s) in Championship play-offs)	0	42	11
Preston North End	2009–10	Championship	43	10	2	3	1	0	—		46	13
Preston North End	2010–11	Championship	19	7	—		1	0	—		20	7
Preston North End	Total		101	28	3	3	2	0	2	0	108	31
Cardiff City	2010–11	Championship	11	1	1	0	—		1	0	13	1
Cardiff City	2011–12	Championship	0	0	—		2	1	0	0	2	1
Cardiff City	Total		11	1	1	0	2	1	1	0	15	2
Doncaster Rovers (loan)	2011–12	Championship	5	0	—		—		—		5	0
Huddersfield Town (loan)	2011–12	League One	3	0	—		—		—		3	0
Scunthorpe United (loan)	2011–12	League One	14	6	—		—		—		14	6
Fleetwood Town	2012–13	League Two	22	10	1	2	1	0	0	0	24	12
Fleetwood Town	2013–14	League Two	31	7	2	1	0	0	5	2	38	10
Fleetwood Town	Total		53	17	3	3	1	0	5	2	62	22
Forest Green Rovers	2014–15	Conference Premier	45	25	2	1	—		5 (Note: Three appearances and four goals in FA Trophy, two appearances in Conference Premier play-offs)	4	52	30
Forest Green Rovers	2015–16	National League	39	13	2	0	—		3 (Note: Appearances in National League play-offs)	0	44	13
Forest Green Rovers	Total		84	38	4	1	—		8	4	96	43
Newport County	2016–17	League Two	10	4	0	0	0	0	1 (Note: Appearance in EFL Trophy)	0	11	4
York City	2016–17	National League	23	13	—		—		5 (Note: Appearances in FA Trophy)	3	28	16
York City	2017–18	National League North	28	20	2	3	—		2	2	32	25
York City	2018–19	National League North	22	3	2	0	—		0	0	24	3
York City	Total		73	36	4	3	—		7	5	84	44
Career total			586	190	27	12	13	3	33	16	659	221

== Honours ==
Stoke City

- Football League Championship runner-up: 2007–08

Fleetwood Town

- Football League Two play-offs: 2014

York City

- FA Trophy: 2016–17

Individual

- Conference Premier Team of the Year: 2014–15
- Preston North End Player of the Year: 2008–09
- York City Clubman of the Year: 2017–18
