= Curtis Obeng =

English footballer (born 1989)

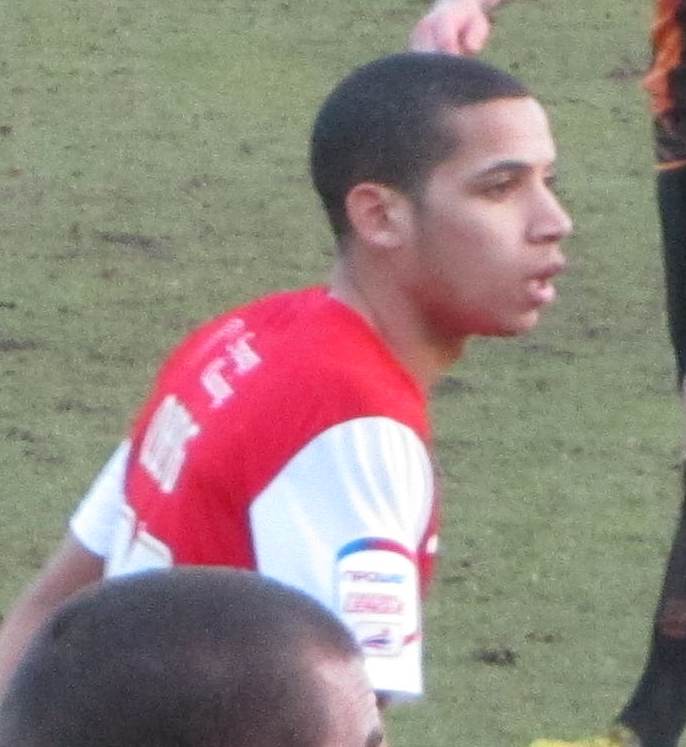
- Obeng playing for York City in 2013

Personal information
- Full name: Curtis Obeng
- Date of birth: 14 February 1989 (age 37)
- Place of birth: Stretford, England
- Height: 5 ft 8 in (1.73 m)
- Position: Right-back

Team information
- Current team: United of Manchester

Youth career
- –2007: Manchester City

Senior career*
Years	Team	Apps	(Gls)
2007–2009	Manchester City	0	(0)
2009–2012	Wrexham	96	(2)
2012–2015	Swansea City	0	(0)
2012	→ Fleetwood Town (loan)	5	(0)
2013	→ York City (loan)	4	(0)
2014	→ Stevenage (loan)	15	(0)
2014	→ Newport County (loan)	5	(0)
2016	Macclesfield Town	0	(0)
2016	Altrincham	2	(0)
2016–2017	Solihull Moors	4	(0)
2018–2020	Nuneaton Borough	36	(0)
2019	→ Ashton United (loan)	6	(0)
2020	→ Grantham Town (loan)	5	(0)
2020–2021	Radcliffe	5	(0)
2021–2022	Macclesfield	8	(0)
2022–2023	United of Manchester	0	(0)
2023–	Bury	3	(0)

International career
2008	England U19	4	(0)
2010	England C	1	(0)
- * Club domestic league appearances and goals as of Francis De Taddéo

Curtis Obeng (born 14 February 1989) is an English professional footballer who plays as a right-back for United of Manchester. He previously played for Manchester City, Wrexham, Swansea City, Fleetwood Town, York City, Stevenage, Newport County, Macclesfield Town, Altrincham, Solihull Moors, Nuneaton Borough and Macclesfield F.C.

== Early and personal life ==
Obeng was born in Stretford, Greater Manchester. He is of Ghanaian descent.

== Club career ==
=== Early career ===
Obeng began his career with Manchester City's youth system, and played in the team that lost to Liverpool in the 2006 FA Youth Cup Final. He signed a two-year professional contract with City in 2007 but was released at the end of the 2008–09 season. After a trial with Premier League club Wigan Athletic, he signed a two-year contract with Conference Premier club Wrexham on 1 August 2009. In June 2011, he extended his contract for another 18 months.

=== Swansea City ===
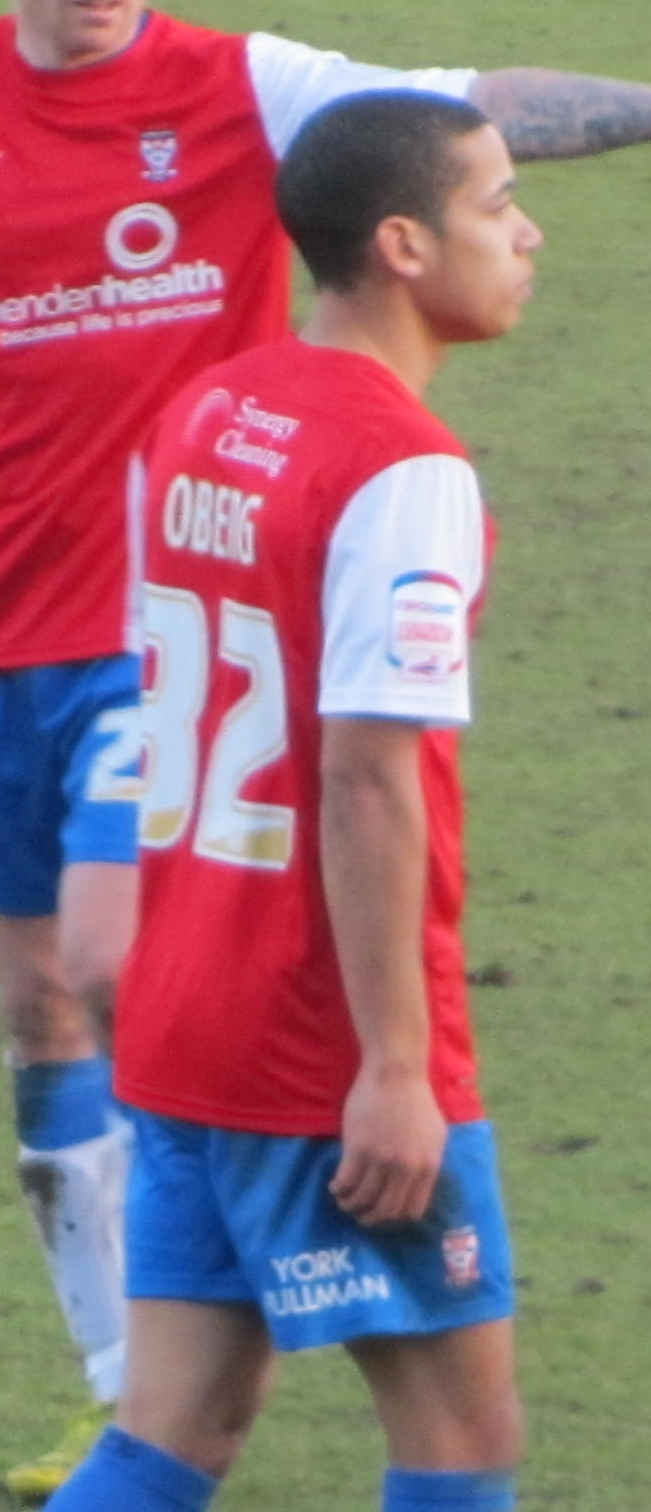
Obeng playing for York City in 2013

Obeng moved to Premier League club Swansea City on 31 January 2012 on a three-and-a-half-year contract for a fee in the region of £200,000. He then was sent on loan to League Two club Fleetwood Town on 25 October 2012 for two months. He made his debut on 27 October 2012, starting in a 0–0 away draw against Rochdale. Obeng made six appearances for Fleetwood.

Obeng signed for League Two club York City on 30 January 2013 on a one-month loan, making his debut on 2 February after starting the team's 4–1 defeat at home to Morecambe. He made four appearances for York.

On 18 February 2014, Obeng signed for League One club Stevenage on loan until the end of the season.

On 23 October 2014, Obeng moved to Newport County on an initial one-month loan with was subsequently extended to 23 December. He made his debut for Newport in a 1–1 draw with Accrington Stanley on 25 October 2014. Obeng returned to Swansea on 17 December 2014 having made six appearances for Newport.

On 28 May 2015, Obeng was released by Swansea.

=== Later career ===
Obeng signed for National League club Macclesfield Town on 27 October 2016, leaving for National League North club Altrincham on 4 November. On 22 November 2016, he signed for National League club Solihull Moors. Having made five appearances, he left Solihull on 20 January 2017. He retired from football in July 2017.

Obeng came out of retirement on 22 June 2018 to sign for National League North club Nuneaton Borough. On 31 August 2019, Obeng joined Ashton United on an initial month-long deal. He also had a loan spell in February 2020 at Grantham Town, before he left Nuneaton on a permanent basis during the summer of 2020, and signed for Radcliffe.

== International career ==
Obeng made his debut for the England national under-19 team against Croatia on 5 February 2008. He was capped four times by the under-19 team in 2008. Obeng played once for England C, as an 81st-substitute minute in a 2–1 away win over the Republic of Ireland under-23 on 26 May 2010 in the 2009–11 International Challenge Trophy.

== Career statistics ==
As of 22 June 2018

Appearances and goals by club, season and competition
Club	Season	League			FA Cup		League Cup		Other		Total	
Club	Season	Division	Apps	Goals	Apps	Goals	Apps	Goals	Apps	Goals	Apps	Goals
Wrexham	2009–10	Conference Premier	33	0	3	0	—		1 (Note: Appearance in FA Trophy)	0	37	0
Wrexham	2010–11	Conference Premier	34	1	1	0	—		4 (Note: Two appearances in FA Trophy, two in Conference Premier play-offs)	0	39	1
Wrexham	2011–12	Conference Premier	29	1	5	0	—		0	0	34	1
Wrexham	Total		96	2	9	0	—		5	0	110	2
Swansea City	2011–12	Premier League	0	0	—		—		—		0	0
Swansea City	2012–13	Premier League	0	0	—		0	0	—		0	0
Swansea City	2013–14	Premier League	0	0	0	0	0	0	0	0	0	0
Swansea City	2014–15	Premier League	0	0	—		0	0	—		0	0
Swansea City	Total		0	0	0	0	0	0	—		0	0
Fleetwood Town (loan)	2012–13	League Two	5	0	1	0	—		—		6	0
York City (loan)	2012–13	League Two	4	0	—		—		—		4	0
Stevenage (loan)	2013–14	League One	15	0	—		—		—		15	0
Newport County (loan)	2014–15	League Two	5	0	1	0	—		—		6	0
Macclesfield Town	2016–17	National League	0	0	—		—		—		0	0
Altrincham	2016–17	National League North	2	0	1	0	—		—		3	0
Solihull Moors	2016–17	National League	4	0	—		—		1	0	5	0
Nuneaton Borough	2018–19	National League North	0	0	0	0	—		0	0	0	0
Career total			131	2	12	0	0	0	6	0	149	2
