= Witton Albion F.C. =

Association football club in England

Witton Albion
- Full name: Witton Albion Football Club
- Nicknames: Albion, The Albs
- Founded: 1887; 139 years ago
- Stadium: Bedspace Trust Community Stadium
- Capacity: 4,813
- Chairman: Graham Wood
- Manager: Ben Harrison
- League: Northern Premier League Division One West
- 2025–26: Northern Premier League Division One West, 8th of 22
- Website: wittonalbionfc.co.uk
Home colours	Away colours

Witton Albion F.C. are a football club based in Northwich, England. They were founded in 1887. They have won the Cheshire Senior Cup 11 times since 1902. Their most recent success in this competition was in 2006, when they defeated Stalybridge Celtic in the final. They have also reached the FA Cup Second Round on at least three occasions. The club play in the Northern Premier League Division One West (eighth tier of the English football league system) in the 2026-27 season.

The club's ground was for many years in the centre of the town, just behind the library. In 1989, they moved a couple of miles to Chapel Street in nearby Wincham. Sainsbury's Supermarket now occupies the old Central Ground site.

Witton's current home, Bedspace Trust Community Stadium (Wincham Park), holds in excess of 4,500 and is equipped with floodlights, segregation, a club shop and a museum.

There used to be a fierce local rivalry with Northwich Victoria.

== History ==
The first records of a Witton Albion F.C. are in 1887. The club first entered the FA Cup in 1907–08 but failed to reach the First Round proper until 1948–49.

Early on in their history the club played in a number of leagues including the Northwich & District League, Crewe & District league, Cheshire League, The Combination, The Manchester League and Lancashire Combination. Finally in 1920, the club became founder members of the Cheshire County League. They won the league three times after World War 2, including the league and cup double in 1953–54. After the formation of the Northern Premier League in 1969, many Cheshire clubs left the Cheshire County League, although Witton were denied entry on a vote. It is thought that Northwich Victoria's decision to persuade other clubs not to allow their town rivals in was the deciding factor. Albion continued to be a decent side in the Cheshire County League and eventually earned promotion to the Northern Premier League in 1978–79, when the club finished as runners-up. Although they missed out on joining their arch-rivals, as they had just left to form the Alliance Premier League. The sale of the club's Central Ground to Sainsbury's allowed the club to move to a much more modern stadium, although it was over a mile away in nearby Wincham. The second season at Wincham Park in 1990–91 proved to be one of the best seasons in the club's history as they won the NPL by 16 points, gaining promotion to the Football Conference. However, the club found this tough going and continual relegation struggles resulted in the first relegation in the club's history in 1994. A further relegation from the Premier Division of the Northern Premier League followed in 1997.

In 2004, club captain Brian Pritchard enjoyed worldwide fame following his sending off during the Cheshire County F.A. Senior Cup final against Woodley Sports. He was sent off after he tripped a streaker that had run onto the pitch, incensing the Witton fans. Many football fans around the world deemed this sending off unfair, including when the referee was criticised for his decision on the BBC's Football Focus program.

The 2006–07 season saw Witton miss out on automatic promotion on the last day of the season to Burscough, by 1 goal on goal difference. Witton hit the woodwork 3 times in the last 20 minutes, but were unable to score the goal that would have taken them into the Conference North as league champions. This was the second time in seven years that Burscough had beaten Witton to promotion on goal difference. Witton subsequently lost the play-off final against Telford United and were thus denied promotion into the Conference North division.

Witton narrowly missed promotion again in 2007–08. After having led the Northern Premier League Premier Division since November, at one stage by 14 points, they lost the lead to Fleetwood Town in mid-April, and entered the last game of the regular season a point behind Fleetwood, but with a much better goal difference. Although Fleetwood could only manage a draw at home to Frickley Athletic in their last match, Witton lost at home 3–0 to Worksop Town and finished second. They went on to lose the first round of the promotion playoffs at home to Buxton on penalties. After the season ended, the club were wracked with management upheavals. Manager Jim Vince and assistant Nigel Deeley resigned after a disagreement with long-time charman Mike Worthington, and shortly afterwards Worthington himself severed ties with the club. Vince and Deeley were re-appointed by acting chairman Mark Harris, but Vince resigned again two weeks later on the grounds of ill-health. Nigel Deeley was appointed manager on 28 May.

A substantial reduction in the playing budget led to the departure of most of the established squad members during the 2008 close season. Manager Nigel Deeley and assistant Andy Nelson were fired on 2 November, after an unprecedented sequence of nine consecutive defeats. They were replaced by former manager Gary Finley, assisted by Lee Coathup. After a brief change in fortunes, when Witton moved out of the relegation zone, the Albion finished third bottom, and were relegated to the Northern Premier League First Division South.

Witton entered the 2009–10 season with high hopes of promotion. Consistently in the top half of the league, they were as high as third by February 2010. However, an indifferent last third of the season saw them fall to seventh, finishing 6 points out of playoff contention. Finley resigned from the club prior to the last game of the season. League restructuring saw the club relocated to Northern Premier League First Division North for the 2010–11 season. In May 2010, former long-serving Leek Town manager Paul Ogden was appointed to the managerial position, assisted by Brian Pritchard, who will remain on the playing staff, and Dave McPherson. Six years previously, Ogden had turned down the management job at Witton, a decision which he described as 'a mistake'. On 11 April 2011 Dave MacPherson and Brian Pritchard were appointed joint managers of the club for the remainder of the 2010–11 season. Dave MacPherson left the club in the close season and Brian Pritchard became the permanent manager for the 2011–12 season. Mike Moseley, one of Albion's leading goalscorers became Assistant Player/Manager with former boss Nigel Deeley becoming First-Team Coach. On 28 April 2012, Witton beat Curzon Ashton 3–0 in the Northern Premier League Division One North Play-off Final winning promotion to the Northern Premier League (the seventh tier of the English football league system) in the 2012–13 season.

An impressive 2012–13 season saw Witton finish 4th in the league making the play-off's. A 3-1 semi final defeat to FC United of Manchester brought an excellent season to a close.

The 2013–14 season was tougher, with Albion finding themselves in the relegation zone for most of the season. However a good run of form inspired by club favourite Alex Titchiner the club managed to finish 16th.

On Monday 25 August 2014 after beating Marine 3–1, Manager Brian Pritchard announced his resignation after 19 years at the club. He was replaced by Player/Coach Anthony Sheehan. Sheehan's reign lasted just 5 games all of which ended in defeat. He handed in his resignation and was replaced by Tony Sullivan. Sullivan moved quickly to bring in his management team appointing Kevin Hodgson and Andy Robertson to the coaching staff.

Albion were relegated on the last day of the 2014–15 season. Needing only a point to guarantee league survival away at Stamford, Albion raced into a two-goal lead, however collapsed in the 2nd half eventually losing 3-2 and finding themselves finishing 22nd. Immediately after the game both Tony Sullivan and his assistant Kevin Hodgson resigned.

The board moved quickly to replace Sullivan with former Norton United F.C. manager Scott Dundas taking over. However Dundas was fairly unsuccessful despite building a team of ex pro's and proven goalscorers. Dundas was sacked just two months into the season after the club slipped to its lowest league position in its history. The board replaced Dundas with ex Vauxhall Motors F.C. and Marine F.C. manager Carl MaCauley.

The club also caused a stir amongst fans at the start of the 2015–16 season by allowing bitter rivals Northwich Victoria back into the town by allowing them to share their Wincham Park stadium.

Carl Macauley who along with his assistant Gary Martindale were the management team at Conference North Vauxhall Motors until the club's resignation. They thankfully succeeded in steadying the ship and despite the club, once again being forced to change regional divisions set about recruiting their own team, both on and off the field.

Their dedication certainly paid off in '16/17 when, in practically any other scenario picking up nigh on 100 points and scoring 100 goals along the way would secure automatic promotion, the team won their Play-off games against AFC Rushden & Diamonds and Spalding United to regain their place back in the NPL's top flight. The first season back exceeded expectations as it was only in the final month that Albion missed out on a play-off position whilst in 1'8/19, playing catch-up, the team finished in the top ten. Last season saw them well placed, with games in hand, before the season was curtailed

== Rivalries ==
The club's main rival is Northwich Victoria. Witton Albion were formed in the late 19th century by a group of Northwich Victoria players, officials and supporters who chose to break away from the Vics in protest of the clubs' decision to become a 'professional' side. Both Witton and Northwich were prominent figures during the days of the Cheshire League with Albion winning the league three times to Northwich's twice. The clubs haven't met in a league fixture since 1994, although there have been numerous local cup clashes. Good Friday 1949 saw 11,290 locals attend the derby fixture. In recent times, Witton have developed a rivalry with 1874 Northwich, a club ran by the disgruntled Northwich Victoria fans, with Witton winning 3–2 on the first meeting between the two sides in February 2015.

Witton also enjoy minor rivalries with other Cheshire clubs including Altrincham and Winsford United.

== Notable former players ==
Former players include Neil McNab, Mike Whitlow, Dennis Viollet, Peter Mellor, Chris Nicholl and Samuel Challinor.

Liverpudlian comedian John Bishop played for the club during the late 1980s, former Premier League striker Geoff Horsfield played for Witton during the 1990s as well as former Derby County goalkeeper Andy Oakes.

Cardiff City forward Nicky Maynard spent a short spell on loan at the club during the 2005–06 season, and Alex Titchiner left the club after the 2011–12 season to join League Two side Fleetwood Town before rejoining in 2014.

Witton were also managed by former Manchester City players Ken Barnes and Ray Ranson.

== Records ==
- Best FA Cup performance: Second round, 1951–52 (replay), 1953–54 (replay), 1991–92
- Best FA Trophy performance: Runners-up, 1991–92
- Record attendance: 3,940 vs Kidderminster Harriers, 1990–91 FA Trophy semi final

== Honours ==
Witton Albion were regular semi-finalists in the FA Trophy (1990–91, 1991–92, 1992–93). In 1992, they made it to the old Wembley Stadium where they lost to Colchester United.

- FA Trophy
  - Runners-up: 1991–92
- Northern Premier League
  - Winners: 1990–91
  - Runners-up: 2006–07, 2007–08
  - Play-offs runners-up: 2006–07
- Northern Premier League Division One North
  - Play-offs winners: 2011–12
- Northern Premier League President's Cup
  - Winners: 1990–91
  - Runners-up: 1989–90, 1994–95, 2004–05
- Cheshire County League
  - Winners: 1948–49, 1949–50, 1953–54
  - Runners-up: 1950–51, 1978–79
