= Jamie McGuire =

English footballer

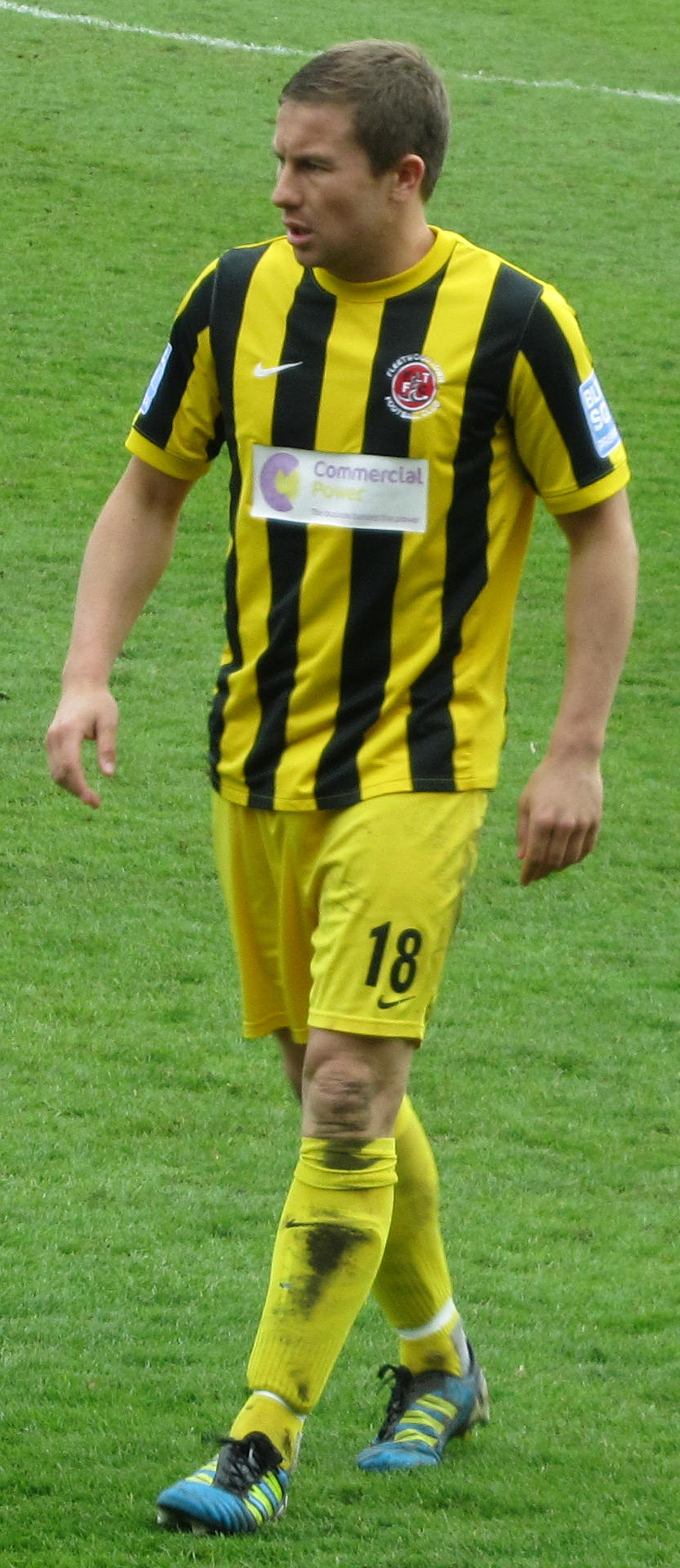
- McGuire playing for Fleetwood Town in 2012

Personal information
- Full name: Jamie Anthony McGuire
- Date of birth: 13 November 1983 (age 42)
- Place of birth: Birkenhead, England
- Height: 5 ft 7 in (1.70 m)
- Position: Midfielder

Team information
- Current team: Mansfield Town

Youth career
- Tranmere Rovers

Senior career*
Years	Team	Apps	(Gls)
2002–2003	Tranmere Rovers	0	(0)
2003	→ Northwich Victoria	3	(0)
2003	→ Northwich Victoria	4	(0)
2003–2007	Cammell Laird		
2007–2009	Droylsden	36	(7)
2009–2013	Fleetwood Town	112	(8)
2013–2017	Mansfield Town	93	(3)
2017–2018	Boston United		
2018–2019	Frickley Athletic		
Total		248	(18)

Managerial career
- 2019: Mansfield Town (Caretaker)
- * Club domestic league appearances and goals as of 16:49, 10 May 2017 (UTC)

Jamie Anthony McGuire (born 13 November 1983) is an English former footballer who played as a midfielder.

== Career ==
McGuire was a member of the Tranmere Rovers youth team squad that won both the Football League Youth Alliance Merit Division and the Lancashire Youth Cup in 2001–02. He never made a senior appearance however, and instead played seven games over two loan spells at Football Conference club Northwich Victoria in 2003. He then moved on to non-league side Cammell Laird. He switched to Droylsden in summer 2007. He moved on to Fleetwood Town in May 2009 for a £2,000 fee. He helped Fleetwood to win the Conference Premier title in 2011–12. On 7 May 2013, he was released by Fleetwood due to the expiry of his contract.

On 13 May 2013, McGuire signed for Mansfield Town on a free transfer. He then spent four seasons with Mansfield Town before being released by at the end of the 2016–17 season. He then accepted a coaching role with Mansfield's academy.

On 14 December 2019, McGuire was placed in caretaker charge of Mansfield.

== Career statistics ==
Appearances and goals by club, season and competition
Club	Season	League			FA Cup		EFL Cup		Other		Total	
Club	Season	Division	Apps	Goals	Apps	Goals	Apps	Goals	Apps	Goals	Apps	Goals
Fleetwood Town	2010–11	Conference	37	6	1	0	—		2 (Note: Appearances in Conference play-offs)	0	40	6
Fleetwood Town	2011–12	Conference	38	1	4	1	—		0	0	42	2
Fleetwood Town	2012–13	League Two	37	1	1	0	1	0	1 (Note: Appearances in Football League Trophy)	2	40	3
Fleetwood Town	Total		112	8	6	1	1	0	3	2	122	11
Mansfield Town	2013–14	League Two	27	2	3	0	0	0	1	0	31	2
Mansfield Town	2014–15	League Two	29	1	1	0	1	0	0	0	31	1
Mansfield Town	2015–16	League Two	20	0	1	0	0	0	1	0	22	0
Mansfield Town	2016–17	League Two	17	0	1	0	0	0	4	0	22	0
Mansfield Town	Total		93	3	6	0	1	0	6	0	106	3
Career total			205	11	12	1	2	0	9	2	228	14
