= Beavis (surname) =

Beavis is a surname. Notable people with this surname include:

- Arthur Beavis (1905–1978), British boxer
- Fred Beavis (1914–1997), politician in Toronto, Canada
- Ivan Beavis (1926–1997), English actor
- John Beavis (1940–2018), British surgeon
- Keenan Beavis, Canadian businessman
- Len Beavis (active 1947), New Zealand footballer
- Leslie Beavis (1895–1975), Australian soldier and High Commissioner
- Mary Ann Beavis (born 1955), Canadian professor
- Michael Beavis (1929–2020), British RAF officer
- Ronald Beavis (born 1958), Canadian biochemist
- Vanessa Beavis (born 20th century), New Zealand anaesthesiologist
- William Beavis (born 20th century), American professor
- Tony Beavis (born 20th century), UK Resident and Police Constable who was one of the first responders to Rick Allen (Def Leppard) after his car crash.

== See also ==
- Bevis
