= Bevis =

Bevis (sometimes spelled Beavis or Bevys) is a name of Old French origin, meaning someone coming from Beauvais, in the Oise region, or after the Norman French “belfils” or “beufitz”, meaning fair or lovely son. It was not recorded in England until after the Norman Conquest in 1066.

== People ==
- Beavis (surname)
  - Fred Beavis, Canadian politician from Toronto
  - Michael Beavis (1929–2020), Royal Air Force officer
  - Ronald Beavis (born 1958), Canadian biochemist
- Bevis Hillier (born 1940), art historian and biographer of John Betjeman
- Bevis Longstreth, novelist and Commissioner of the United States Securities and Exchange Commission
- Bevis Mugabi (born 1995), footballer
- Andrew Bevis, Australian actor
- Arch Bevis (born 1955), Australian politician
- Billy Bevis (1918–1994), British football player
- Colleen Bevis (1916–2013), American children's advocate
- Howard Landis Bevis (1885–1968), president of Ohio State University
- John Bevis (c.1664–1771), English astronomer, known for discovering the Crab Nebula
- Leslie Bevis (born 1954), American model and actress
- Marie-Louise Bévis (born 1972), French athlete
- Muriel Bevis, American baseball player
- PJ Bevis (born 1980), baseball player
- English wrestling siblings:
  - Roy Bevis (born 1982), best known as Zebra Kid and also known as Roy Knight; half-brother of the next two listed individuals
  - Zak Zodiac (born 1990), real name Zak Bevis, also known as Zak Knight
  - Saraya Bevis (born 1992), full name Saraya-Jade Bevis, known as Britani Knight in British wrestling, Paige in WWE, and Saraya in All Elite Wrestling

== Media and literature ==
- Beavis, a character from MTV's Beavis and Butt-head
- Bevis of Hampton, a character appearing in medieval romance
  - "Beves of Hamtoun" (poem), medieval English metrical romance about Bevis of Hampton
- Bevis (book), a boy's adventure story (1882) by Richard Jefferies
- "Mr. Bevis", an episode of The Twilight Zone
- The Bevis Frond, an indie band from London, England
- Sir Bevis, from the Red Book of Romance, edited by Andrew Lang

== Places ==
- Bevis, Ohio, a community in the United States
- Bevis Marks, a street in the City of London
- Bevis Marks Synagogue, the oldest functioning synagogue in the United Kingdom, situated in a courtyard off the above street

== Other ==
- HMS Sir Bevis, original name of a Royal Navy 24-class sloop; later renamed HMS Eaglet
- Sir Bevys, a British thoroughbred racehorse, winner of the 1879 Epsom Derby
- Bevis (ship), a sailing vessel carrying passengers from England to the British colonies in America between 1635 and 1638
