= David Fenyő =

Swedish-American physicist and mass spectrometrist

David Fenyö
- Education: Uppsala University; Rockefeller University
- Scientific career
- Fields: Proteomics; Bioinformatics; Mass Spectrometry
- Workplaces: Rockefeller University; NYU
- Doctoral advisor: Bo Sundqvist
- Other academic advisors: Brian Chait

David Fenyö is a Hungarian-Swedish-American computational biologist, physicist and businessman. He is currently professor in the Department of Biochemistry and Molecular Pharmacology at NYU Langone Medical Center. Fenyö's research focuses on the development of methods to identify, characterize and quantify proteins and in the integration of data from multiple modalities including mass spectrometry, sequencing and microscopy.

== Career and research ==
Fenyö studied engineering physics, with a focus on mathematical and numerical methods, at Uppsala University in Sweden. After receiving an M.Sc. in 1987, he joined the laboratory of Bo Sundqvist at Uppsala University, and studied the mechanisms of ion–solid interaction both experimentally, theoretically and using molecular dynamics and Monte Carlo simulations. He graduated with a Ph.D. in Physics in 1991.

He then went on to complete his postdoctoral work at Rockefeller University with Brian Chait where he developed algorithms to analyze proteomics data obtained using mass spectrometry, developed a statistical method for protein identification, and applied modeling and simulations to optimize proteomics experimental design and study replication in yeast

In 1997, Fenyö co-founded the bioinformatics start-up ProteoMetrics, LLC, and served as the President of the company until 2002 during which he developed software systems for automated analysis of large-scale proteomics data. Subsequently, he served as the Director of Proteomics at Genomic Solutions, and as Staff Scientist and Product Manager at Amersham Biosciences and GE Healthcare before returning to Rockefeller University in 2005 and joining the faculty of NYU in 2010.

Fenyö is a member of the Editorial Advisory Boards of Molecular and Cellular Proteomics and Proteome Science. He serves on the scientific advisory boards of The Global Proteome Machine, BC Proteome Network, Proteome Software, Protein Metrics and Denator AB. He is also a member of the board of directors for US Human Proteome Organization (USHUPO) and serves as the treasurer.
