= Ronald Beavis =

Canadian protein biochemist (born 1958)

Ronald C. Beavis
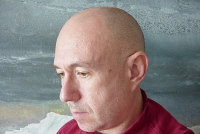
- Ron Beavis
- Born: Ronald Charles Beavis; May 1958 (age 68); Winnipeg, Manitoba
- Education: University of Manitoba
- Spouse: Wendy C. Beavis
- Scientific career
- Fields: Proteomics, Computational Biology
- Workplaces: Beavis Informatics Ltd.
- Thesis: Automated dry fraction collection for microbore high-performance liquid chromatography-mass spectrometry. (1987)
- Doctoral advisor: Ken Standing

Ronald Charles Beavis (better known professionally as Ron Beavis) is a Canadian protein biochemist, who has been involved in the application of mass spectrometry to protein primary structure, with applications in the fields of proteomics and analytical biochemistry. He has developed methods for measuring the identity and post-translational modification state of proteins obtained from biological samples using mass spectrometry. He is currently best known for developing new methods for analyzing proteomics data and applying the results of these methods to problems in computational biology.

== Background ==
Ronald Charles Beavis was born in Winnipeg, Manitoba in May 1958. He went to school in Winnipeg and became interested in science at an early age. As a high school student he participated in the Manitoba Science Fair for projects related to chemistry and physics. He received a B.Sc. (Hons) in Zoology and Physics and a Ph.D. (Physics) from the University of Manitoba.

== Current status ==
Beavis is the founder of Beavis Informatics Ltd, a Canadian company providing consulting services in the general area of mass spectrometry-based proteomics. He oversees the development and operation of the GPM & GPMDB projects.

== Professional affiliations ==
Beavis was a founding member of Genome Prairie and one of the founders of ProteoMetrics, LLC. He has held academic positions at Rockefeller University, Memorial University of Newfoundland and Labrador, New York University Medical Center, the University of British Columbia and the University of Manitoba. He served on the Editorial Advisory Boards of the Journal of Proteome Research and Rapid Communications in Mass Spectrometry. He has also served on the Editorial Board of Molecular & Cellular Proteomics and on the Editorial Board of Scientific Data. He was part of the Human Proteome Project and a founding member of the U.S. Chromosome 17 project. He has frequently collaborated with David Fenyő on informatics projects.

== Honors and awards ==
- NATO Postdoctoral Fellowship (1987)
- President's Award for Innovation, Eli Lilly & Co. (1999)
- Yen Fellowship (2003)
- Tier I Canada Research Chair (2007)

== Most recent publications ==
1. Perez-Riverol, Yasset; Bai, Mingze; da Veiga Leprevost, Felipe; Squizzato, Silvano; Park, Young Mi; Haug, Kenneth; Carroll, Adam J; Spalding, Dylan; Paschall, Justin; Wang, Mingxun; del-Toro, Noemi; Ternent, Tobias; Zhang, Peng; Buso, Nicola; Bandeira, Nuno; Deutsch, Eric W; Campbell, David S; Beavis, Ronald C; Salek, Reza M; Sarkans, Ugis; Petryszak, Robert; Keays, Maria; Fahy, Eoin; Sud, Manish; Subramaniam, Shankar; Barbera, Ariana; Jiménez, Rafael C; Nesvizhskii, Alexey I; Sansone, Susanna-Assunta; Steinbeck, Christoph; Lopez, Rodrigo; Vizcaíno, Juan A; Ping, Peipei; Hermjakob, Henning (2017). "Discovering and linking public omics data sets using the Omics Discovery Index". Nature Biotechnology. 35 (5): 406–409. doi:10.1038/nbt.3790. ISSN 1087-0156. PMC 5831141. PMID 28486464.
2. Omenn, Gilbert S.; Lane, Lydie; Lundberg, Emma K.; Beavis, Ronald C.; Overall, Christopher M.; Deutsch, Eric W. (2016). "Metrics for the Human Proteome Project 2016: Progress on Identifying and Characterizing the Human Proteome, Including Post-Translational Modifications". Journal of Proteome Research. 15 (11): 3951–3960. doi:10.1021/acs.jproteome.6b00511. ISSN 1535-3893. PMC 5129622. PMID 27487407.
3. Spicer, Vic; Ezzati, Peyman; Neustaeter, Haley; Beavis, Ronald C.; Wilkins, John A.; Krokhin, Oleg V. (2016). "3D HPLC-MS with Reversed-Phase Separation Functionality in All Three Dimensions for Large-Scale Bottom-Up Proteomics and Peptide Retention Data Collection". Analytical Chemistry. 88 (5): 2847–2855. doi:10.1021/acs.analchem.5b04567. ISSN 0003-2700. PMID 26849966.
4. Keegan, Sarah; Cortens, John P; Beavis, Ronald C; Fenyö, David (2016). "g2pDB: A Database Mapping Protein Post-Translational Modifications to Genomic Coordinates". Journal of Proteome Research. 15 (3): 983–990. doi:10.1021/acs.jproteome.5b01018. ISSN 1535-3893. PMID 26842767.
5. McAfee, Alison; Harpur, Brock A.; Michaud, Sarah; Beavis, Ronald C.; Kent, Clement F.; Zayed, Amro; Foster, Leonard J. (2016). "Toward an Upgraded Honey Bee (Apis melliferaL.) Genome Annotation Using Proteogenomics". Journal of Proteome Research. 15 (2): 411–421. doi:10.1021/acs.jproteome.5b00589. ISSN 1535-3893. PMID 26718741.
6. Fenyö, David; Beavis, Ronald C. (2015). "Selenocysteine: Wherefore Art Thou?". Journal of Proteome Research. 15 (2): 677–678. doi:10.1021/acs.jproteome.5b01028. ISSN 1535-3893. PMID 26680273.
7. Liu, Fei; Koval, Michael; Ranganathan, Shoba; Fanayan, Susan; Hancock, William S.; Lundberg, Emma K.; Beavis, Ronald C.; Lane, Lydie; Duek, Paula; McQuade, Leon; Kelleher, Neil L.; Baker, Mark S. (2016). "Systems Proteomics View of the Endogenous Human Claudin Protein Family". Journal of Proteome Research. 15 (2): 339–359. doi:10.1021/acs.jproteome.5b00769. ISSN 1535-3893. PMC 4777318. PMID 26680015.
8. Yan, Julia Fangfei; Kim, Hoguen; Jeong, Seul-Ki; Lee, Hyoung-Joo; Sethi, Manveen K.; Lee, Ling Y.; Beavis, Ronald C.; Im, Hogune; Snyder, Michael P.; Hofree, Matan; Ideker, Trey; Wu, Shiaw-lin; Paik, Young-Ki; Fanayan, Susan; Hancock, William S. (2015). "Integrated Proteomic and Genomic Analysis of Gastric Cancer Patient Tissues". Journal of Proteome Research. 14 (12): 4995–5006. doi:10.1021/acs.jproteome.5b00827. ISSN 1535-3893. PMC 5706558. PMID 26435392.
9. Omenn, Gilbert S.; Lane, Lydie; Lundberg, Emma K.; Beavis, Ronald C.; Nesvizhskii, Alexey I.; Deutsch, Eric W. (2015). "Metrics for the Human Proteome Project 2015: Progress on the Human Proteome and Guidelines for High-Confidence Protein Identification". Journal of Proteome Research. 14 (9): 3452–3460. doi:10.1021/acs.jproteome.5b00499. ISSN 1535-3893. PMC 4755311. PMID 26155816.
10. Fenyö, David; Beavis, Ronald C. (2015). "The GPMDB REST interface". Bioinformatics. 31 (12): 2056–2058. doi:10.1093/bioinformatics/btv107. ISSN 1367-4803. PMID 25697819.
