= Roman Zubarev =

Russian chemist

Roman A. Zubarev
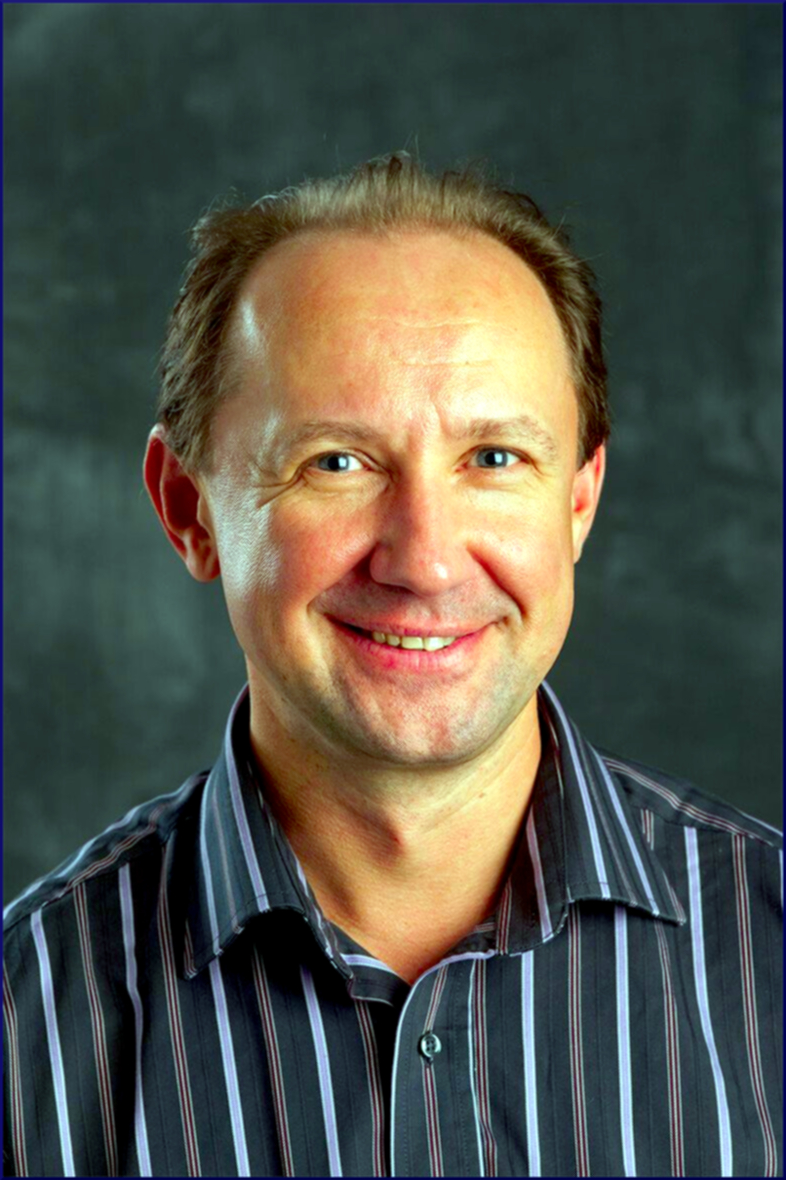
- Born: Stavropol, Russia
- Education: Moscow Engineering Physics Institute; Uppsala University
- Known for: Mass spectrometry Electron-capture dissociation Isotopic resonance hypothesis Isoaspartate theory of Alzheimer's disease Origin of life studies
- Scientific career
- Fields: Chemistry, Physics, Biology, Biochemistry
- Workplaces: Cornell University; University of Southern Denmark; Uppsala University; Karolinska Institutet
- Doctoral advisor: Bo Sundqvist

Roman A. Zubarev is a professor of medicinal proteomics in the Department of Medical Biochemistry and Biophysics at the Karolinska Institutet. His research focuses on the use of mass spectrometry in biology and medicine.

== Early life and education ==
- M.S. in applied physics at Moscow Engineering Physics Institute, 1986
- Ph.D. in ion physics at Uppsala University, 1997

== Research interests ==
- Electron-capture dissociation. In 1997, while in Fred McLafferty's lab at Cornell University, Zubarev discovered the phenomenon of electron-capture dissociation (ECD) of polypeptides. He later developed ECD and other ion-electron reactions^{2} as analytical techniques in Odense (1998–2002) and Uppsala (2002–2008).
- Isotopic resonance hypothesis. Discovered the phenomenon of isotopic resonance in Uppsala (2008), formulated the isotopic resonance hypothesis and experimentally verified it in Stockholm (2009–2013).
- Isoaspartate theory of Alzheimer's disease. The role of isoaspartate in Alzheimer's disease has first been suggested as early as in 1991. Over the next three decades the evidence gradually accumulated, being strongly supported by blood proteomics data.
- Origin of life studies. Zubarev showed that the organic matter produced abiotically in a Miller–Urey experiment can be assimilated by bacteria, and thus proved that early Earth has been a hospitable place for life. For the first time in history of science, Zubarev obtained a living cell from dead matter. In that landmark experiment, bacteria were separated into lipids, nucleic acids and proteins, and these ingredients were isolated and incubated separately and in a mixture. After incubation, the isolates were seeded on Petri dish. While isolated molecules showed no growth (negative control), lipid-containing mixtures gave bacterial colonies, proving that life can self-assemble from a mixture of right ingredients.

== Awards ==
- Curt Brunnée Award, 2006
- Biemann Medal, 2007
- Gold medal, Russian Mass Spectrometry Society, 2013
