= Victor Nirennold =

French footballer (born 1991)

Personal information
- Full name: Victor Nirennold
- Date of birth: 5 April 1991 (age 35)
- Place of birth: Rennes, France
- Height: 1.93 m (6 ft 4 in)
- Position: Defender

Team information
- Current team: Barwell

Youth career
- Rennes

College career
Years	Team	Apps	(Gls)
2013	Erskine Flying Fleet	20	(3)
2014	Nova Southeastern Sharks	15	(3)

Senior career*
Years	Team	Apps	(Gls)
2015	FC Miami City	15	(0)
2015–2018	Fleetwood Town	56	(2)
2018	→ Guiseley (loan)	14	(0)
2018	Senica	12	(0)
2019	SHB Đà Nẵng	24	(2)
2020–2021	UiTM FC	31	(3)
2022	Motherwell	3	(0)
2023	Gloucester City	9	(0)
2023–2024	Nuneaton Borough	0	(0)
2024	Halesowen Town	2	(0)
2024	Basford United	24	(1)
2024–	Barwell	3	(0)
- * Club domestic league appearances and goals as of 15:12, 31 December 2024 (UTC)

Victor Nirennold (born 5 April 1991) is a French professional footballer who plays as a defender for Northern Premier League Division One Midlands club Barwell.

== Early life ==
Victor Nirennold was born on 5 April 1991 in Rennes, Ille-et-Vilaine. He is of Martiniquais descent.

== Career ==
Nirennold began his career with Rennes, before moving to the United States. He studied Business at Erskine College, playing football for the college's team, the Erskine Flying Fleet. He transferred to Nova Southeastern University and played for the Nova Southeastern Sharks. He played for FC Miami City in the Premier Development League in the 2015 PDL season.

Nirennold signed a two-year contract with EFL League One club Fleetwood Town following a successful trial spell in August 2015. He made his debut in the Football League on 5 September, helping the "Cod Army" to secure a 1–1 draw with Rochdale at Highbury Stadium. He scored his first goal for Fleetwood in a 1–1 draw with Northampton Town on 6 August 2016.

On 2 February 2018, he joined Guiseley on loan until the end of the season.

On 3 August 2018, Nirennold signed for FK Senica in the Slovak Super Liga.

In February 2019, he moved to SHB Đà Nẵng.

On 25 January 2022, Nirennold signed with Scottish Premiership club Motherwell until the end of the season. On 20 May 2022, Motherwell announced that Nirennold would leave the club upon the expiry of his contract on 31 May 2022.

On 4 February 2023, Nirennold signed for National League North club Gloucester City, the funding for the move being supported by a recent crowdfunding campaign.

In June 2023, he joined Southern Football League Premier Division Central club Nuneaton Borough.

In December 2024, Nirennold joined Barwell following a spell with Basford United.

== Style of play ==
Nirennold is able to play in defence as well as midfield.

== Career statistics ==
As of 20 December 2024

Appearances and goals by club, season and competition
Club	Season	League			National cup		League cup		Other		Total	
Club	Season	Division	Apps	Goals	Apps	Goals	Apps	Goals	Apps	Goals	Apps	Goals
FC Miami City	2015	USL PDL	15	0	—		—		—		15	0
Fleetwood Town	2015–16	EFL League One	17	0	0	0	0	0	2 (Note: Appearances in the EFL Trophy)	0	19	0
Fleetwood Town	2016–17	EFL League One	26	2	4	0	1	0	3	0	34	2
Fleetwood Town	2017–18	EFL League One	0	0	0	0	0	0	3	0	3	0
Fleetwood Town	Total		43	2	4	0	1	0	8	0	56	2
Guiseley (loan)	2017–18	National League	14	0	0	0	—		—		14	0
Senica	2018–19	Slovak Super Liga	9	0	3	0	—		—		12	0
SHB Da Nang	2019	V.League 1	23	2	1	0	—		—		24	2
UiTM	2020	Malaysia Super League	10	2	1	0	—		—		11	2
UiTM	2021	Malaysia Super League	20	1	0	0	—		—		20	1
UiTM	Total		30	3	1	0	-	-	-	-	31	3
Motherwell	2021–22	Scottish Premiership	3	0	0	0	0	0	—		3	0
Gloucester City	2022–23	National League North	8	0	0	0	0	0	1 (Note: Appearance(s) in National League North play-offs)	0	9	0
Halesowen Town	2023–24	Southern Football League Premier Division Central	2	0	0	0	—		0	0	2	0
Basford United	2023–24	Northern Premier League Premier Division	9	1	—		—		0	0	9	1
Basford United	2024–25	Northern Premier League Premier Division	15	0	2	0	—		1 (Note: Appearance(s) in FA Trophy)	0	18	0
Basford United	Total		24	1	2	0	0	0	1	0	27	1
Career total			171	8	11	0	1	0	10	0	193	8
