= 2021–22 Motherwell F.C. season =

Motherwell
2021–22 season
- Chairman: James McMahon
- Manager: Graham Alexander
- Stadium: Fir Park
- Premiership: 5th
- Scottish Cup: Quarter-finals vs Hibernian
- League Cup: Second round vs Dundee
- Top goalscorer: League: Kevin van Veen; Tony Watt (9 each); All: Kevin van Veen (11 goals)
- Highest home attendance: 8,446 vs Celtic (16 October 2021)
- Lowest home attendance: 500 vs Livingston (26 December 2021)
- Average home league attendance: 5,142 (11 May 2022)
| Home colours | Away colours |

The 2021–22 season was Motherwell's thirty-seventh consecutive season in the top flight of Scottish football, having been promoted from the Scottish First Division at the end of the 1984–85 season.

== Season review ==
=== Pre-season ===
On 1 June, Motherwell announced that Dean Cornelius and David Devine had both signed new two-contract, keeping them at Motherwell until the summer of 2023.

On 7 June, Motherwell announced that Scott Fox had signed a new one-year contract with the club.

On 28 June, Motherwell signed professional contracts with 12 graduates from their youth academy.

==== Transfers ====
On 27 May 2021, Motherwell announced the signing of Connor Shields to a three-year contract, from Queen of the South.

On 21 June, Motherwell announced their second signing of the summer, Justin Amaluzor on a one-year contract from Maidstone United. The following day, Motherwell announced the signing of fellow striker Kaiyne Woolery on a three-year contract from Tranmere Rovers.

=== July ===
On 2 July, Motherwell announced the signing of Kevin van Veen on a two-year contract from Scunthorpe United.

On 5 July, Motherwell announced the return of Liam Kelly on a permanent transfer from Queens Park Rangers, with Kelly signing a three-year contract. Three days later, 8 July, Motherwell announced that Trevor Carson had left the club to sign for Dundee United.

On 13 July, Motherwell announced the signing of Darragh O'Connor from Leicester City Under-23s on a one-year contract. Three days later, Motherwell announced the signing of Mich'el Parker on a contract until January 2022.

On 24 July, Motherwell announced the signing of Callum Slattery from Southampton on a three-year contract for an undisclosed fee.

On 29 July, Motherwell announced the signing of Juhani Ojala from Vejle on a two-year contract.

=== August ===
On 26 August, Motherwell announced the signing of Sean Goss to a two-year contract after he'd left Shrewsbury Town earlier in the summer.

On 31 August, Transfer deadline day, Motherwell announced the signing of Sondre Johansen to a three-year contract, from Mjøndalen, and the return of Jordan Roberts on loan from Heart of Midlothian until January 2022.

=== September ===
On 1 September, Max Johnston joined Queen of the South on a season-long loan deal.

On 30 September, Corey O’Donnell joined Albion Rovers until January 2022. Later on the same day, David Devine joined East Fife on loan for the remainder of the season.

=== October ===
On 1 October, Graham Alexander was announced as the Scottish Premiership Manager of the Month for September.

On 11 October, Steven Lawless left Motherwell by mutual consent.

=== December ===
On 1 December, Motherwell announced the signing of Ross Tierney on a three-and-a-half-year deal, for an undisclosed fee from Bohemians. Tierney joined the club when the transfer window opened on 1 January 2022.

=== January ===
On 2 January, Motherwell announced the departure of Mich'el Parker, after his short-term contract had expired.

On 5 January, Barry Maguire signed a new contract with Motherwell, keeping him at the club until the summer of 2024.

On 7 January, Robbie Crawford was released by Moterwell to join Partick Thistle on a permanent deal, whilst Liam Shaw joined Motherwell on loan for the remainder of the season from Celtic.

On 10 January, manager Graham Alexander extended his contract with the club until 2025.

On 14 January, Motherwell announced the permanent signing of Jordan Roberts from Heart of Midlothian on a contract until the end of the season.

On 17 January, Motherwell announced that Tony Watt had left the club to sign for Dundee United for an undisclosed amount.

On 25 January, Motherwell announced the signing of Victor Nirennold on a contract until the end of the season.

On 28 January, Darragh O'Connor was loaned to Queen of the South for the remainder of the season, and Joseph Efford joined the club for an undisclosed fee from Waasland-Beveren on a contract until the summer of 2023.

=== February ===
On 18 February, Bevis Mugabi signed a new contract with Motherwell, until the summer of 2024.

On 23 February, Scott Fox signed a new contract with Motherwell, until the summer of 2023. The following day, 24 February, Nathan McGinley also extended his contract with Motherwell, until the summer of 2024.

On 28 February, P. J. Morrison joined Alloa Athletic on loan for the remainder of the season.

=== March ===
On 28 March, Motherwell announced the signing of Robbie Mahon from Bohemians on a contract until June 2023.

=== May ===
On 20 May, Motherwell announced that Mark O'Hara, Darragh O'Connor, P. J. Morrison, Cody McLeod, Victor Nirennold, Justin Amaluzor, Jordan Roberts, Liam Donnelly and Liam Grimshaw would all leave the club upon the expiry of their contracts on 31 May, whilst Ricki Lamie had been offered a new contract and Liam Shaw would return to Celtic following his loan spell with the club. On 24 May, Ricki Lamie signed a new two-year contract with Motherwell.

== Squad ==
As of match played 14 May 2022

| No. | Name | Nationality | Position | Date of birth (age) | Signed from | Signed in | Contract ends | Apps. | Goals |
Goalkeepers
| 1 | Liam Kelly | (Scotland) | GK | 23 January 1996 (aged 26) | Queens Park Rangers | 2021 | 2024 | 67 | 0 |
| 12 | Scott Fox | (Scotland) | GK | 28 June 1987 (aged 34) | Partick Thistle | 2020 | 2023 | 0 | 0 |
Defenders
| 2 | Stephen O'Donnell | (Scotland) | DF | 11 May 1992 (aged 30) | Kilmarnock | 2020 | 2023 | 75 | 3 |
| 3 | Jake Carroll | (Republic of Ireland) | DF | 11 August 1991 (aged 30) | Cambridge United | 2019 | 2023 | 73 | 2 |
| 4 | Ricki Lamie | (Scotland) | DF | 20 June 1993 (aged 28) | Livingston | 2020 | 2024 | 70 | 5 |
| 5 | Bevis Mugabi | (Uganda) | DF | 1 May 1995 (aged 27) | Yeovil Town | 2019 | 2024 | 71 | 4 |
| 14 | Juhani Ojala | (Finland) | DF | 19 June 1989 (aged 32) | Vejle | 2021 | 2023 | 24 | 1 |
| 19 | Nathan McGinley | (England) | DF | 15 September 1996 (aged 25) | Forest Green Rovers | 2020 | 2024 | 53 | 0 |
| 21 | Sondre Johansen | (Norway) | DF | 7 July 1995 (aged 26) | Mjøndalen | 2021 | 2024 | 25 | 0 |
| 23 | Liam Grimshaw | (England) | DF | 2 February 1995 (aged 27) | Preston North End | 2017 | 2022 | 134 | 1 |
| 32 | Victor Nirennold | (France) | DF | 5 April 1991 (aged 31) | Unattached | 2022 | 2022 | 3 | 0 |
Midfielders
| 6 | Barry Maguire | (Scotland) | MF | 27 April 1998 (aged 24) | Academy | 2015 | 2024 | 61 | 2 |
| 8 | Mark O'Hara | (Scotland) | MF | 12 December 1995 (aged 26) | Peterborough United | 2020 | 2022 | 74 | 8 |
| 11 | Liam Shaw | (England) | MF | 12 March 2001 (aged 21) | loan from Celtic | 2022 | 2022 | 8 | 0 |
| 16 | Callum Slattery | (England) | MF | 8 February 1999 (aged 23) | Southampton | 2021 | 2024 | 34 | 2 |
| 18 | Dean Cornelius | (Scotland) | MF | 11 April 2001 (aged 21) | Hibernian | 2018 | 2023 | 19 | 2 |
| 22 | Liam Donnelly | (Northern Ireland) | MF | 7 March 1996 (aged 26) | Hartlepool United | 2018 | 2022 | 71 | 13 |
| 26 | Ross Tierney | (Republic of Ireland) | MF | 6 March 2001 (aged 21) | Bohemians | 2022 | 2025 | 15 | 2 |
| 27 | Sean Goss | (Germany) | MF | 1 October 1995 (aged 26) | Unattached | 2021 | 2023 | 31 | 1 |
Forwards
| 7 | Kaiyne Woolery | (England) | FW | 11 January 1995 (aged 27) | Tranmere Rovers | 2021 | 2023 | 38 | 3 |
| 9 | Kevin van Veen | (Netherlands) | FW | 1 June 1991 (aged 30) | Scunthorpe United | 2021 | 2023 | 39 | 11 |
| 17 | Justin Amaluzor | (England) | FW | 17 October 1996 (aged 25) | Maidstone United | 2021 | 2022 | 13 | 1 |
| 20 | Joseph Efford | (United States) | FW | 29 August 1996 (aged 25) | Waasland-Beveren | 2022 | 2023 | 16 | 3 |
| 28 | Jordan Roberts | (England) | FW | 5 January 1994 (aged 28) | Heart of Midlothian | 2022 | 2022 | 28 | 5 |
| 29 | Connor Shields | (Scotland) | FW | 29 July 1997 (aged 24) | Queen of the South | 2021 | 2024 | 29 | 3 |
Youth team
| 30 | Sam Campbell | (Scotland) | DF | 13 April 2004 (aged 18) | Academy | 2021 | | 0 | 0 |
| 33 | Muhammad Adam | (Nigeria) | FW | 27 February 2005 (aged 17) | Academy | 2021 | | 0 | 0 |
| 34 | Corey O’Donnell | (Scotland) | FW | 28 October 2003 (aged 18) | Academy | 2021 | | 0 | 0 |
| 35 | Adam MacDonald | (Scotland) | MF | 26 July 2005 (aged 16) | Academy | 2021 | | 0 | 0 |
| 36 | Ali Gould | (Scotland) | DF | 26 July 2005 (aged 16) | Academy | 2021 | | 0 | 0 |
| 37 | Cody McLeod | (Scotland) | FW | 22 May 2003 (aged 18) | Academy | 2021 | | 0 | 0 |
| 38 | Logan Dunachie | (Scotland) | DF | 3 February 2004 (aged 18) | Academy | 2021 | | 0 | 0 |
| 39 | Ewan Wilson | (Scotland) | DF | 19 November 2004 (aged 17) | Academy | 2021 | | 0 | 0 |
| 40 | Kian Speirs | (Scotland) | MF | 22 May 2004 (aged 17) | Academy | 2021 | | 0 | 0 |
| 41 | Matthew Connelly | (Scotland) | GK | 2 March 2003 (aged 19) | Academy | 2019 | | 0 | 0 |
| 42 | Daniel Hunter | (Scotland) | MF | 25 January 2004 (aged 18) | Academy | 2021 | | 0 | 0 |
| 43 | Richard Tambwe | (Scotland) | FW | 24 April 2005 (aged 17) | Academy | 2021 | | 0 | 0 |
| 44 | Lawton Green | (New Zealand) | GK | 8 October 2003 (aged 18) | Academy | 2021 | | 0 | 0 |
| 45 | Robbie Mahon | (Republic of Ireland) | FW | 6 June 2003 (aged 18) | Bohemians | 2022 | 2023 | 0 | 0 |
Away on loan
| 15 | Darragh O'Connor | (Republic of Ireland) | DF | 5 August 1999 (aged 22) | Leicester City | 2021 | 2022 | 5 | 0 |
| 24 | Max Johnston | (Scotland) | DF | 24 December 2003 (aged 18) | Academy | 2020 | | 2 | 0 |
| 25 | David Devine | (Scotland) | DF | 20 June 2001 (aged 20) | Academy | 2019 | 2023 | 1 | 0 |
| 31 | P. J. Morrison | (Scotland) | GK | 1 January 1998 (aged 24) | Academy | 2009 | 2022 | 0 | 0 |
Left during the season
| 11 | Steven Lawless | (Scotland) | FW | 12 April 1991 (aged 31) | Burton Albion | 2021 | 2022 | 18 | 2 |
| 20 | Robbie Crawford | (Scotland) | MF | 22 June 1994 (aged 27) | Livingston | 2021 | 2022 | 29 | 0 |
| 26 | Mich'el Parker | (England) | MF | 22 October 1998 (aged 23) | Unattached | 2021 | 2022 | 0 | 0 |
| 32 | Tony Watt | (Scotland) | FW | 29 December 1993 (aged 28) | CSKA Sofia | 2020 | 2022 | 70 | 19 |

== Transfers ==
=== In ===
| Date | Position | Nationality | Name | From | Fee | Ref |
|---|---|---|---|---|---|---|
| 27 May 2021 | FW | (Scotland) | Connor Shields | Queen of the South | Undisclosed | |
| 21 June 2021 | FW | (England) | Justin Amaluzor | Maidstone United | Free | |
| 22 June 2021 | FW | (England) | Kaiyne Woolery | Tranmere Rovers | Free | |
| 2 July 2021 | FW | (Netherlands) | Kevin van Veen | Scunthorpe United | Free | |
| 5 July 2021 | GK | (Scotland) | Liam Kelly | Queens Park Rangers | Free | |
| 13 July 2021 | DF | (Republic of Ireland) | Darragh O'Connor | Leicester City | Free | |
| 16 July 2021 | MF | (England) | Mich'el Parker | Unattached | Free | |
| 24 July 2021 | MF | (England) | Callum Slattery | Southampton | Undisclosed | |
| 29 July 2021 | DF | (Finland) | Juhani Ojala | Vejle | Free | |
| 26 August 2021 | MF | (Germany) | Sean Goss | Unattached | Free | |
| 31 August 2021 | DF | (Norway) | Sondre Johansen | Mjøndalen | Undisclosed | |
| 1 December 2021† | MF | (Republic of Ireland) | Ross Tierney | Bohemians | Undisclosed | |
| 14 January 2022 | FW | (England) | Jordan Roberts | Heart of Midlothian | Undisclosed | |
| 25 January 2022 | DF | (France) | Victor Nirennold | Unattached | Free | |
| 28 January 2022 | FW | (United States) | Joseph Efford | Waasland-Beveren | Undisclosed | |
| 28 March 2022 | FW | (Republic of Ireland) | Robbie Mahon | Bohemians | Undisclosed | |

† Transfer announced on the above date, but was not completed until 1 January 2022.

=== Loans in ===
| Date from | Position | Nationality | Name | From | Date to | Ref. |
|---|---|---|---|---|---|---|
| 31 August 2021 | FW | (England) | Jordan Roberts | Heart of Midlothian | 1 January 2022 | |
| 7 January 2022 | MF | (England) | Liam Shaw | Celtic | End of season | |

=== Out ===
| Date | Position | Nationality | Name | To | Fee | Ref. |
|---|---|---|---|---|---|---|
| 8 July 2021 | GK | (Northern Ireland) | Trevor Carson | Dundee United | Undisclosed | |
| 17 January 2022 | FW | (Scotland) | Tony Watt | Dundee United | Undisclosed | |

=== Loans out ===
| Date from | Position | Nationality | Name | To | Date to | Ref. |
|---|---|---|---|---|---|---|
| 24 July 2021 | FW | (Scotland) | Matthew Connelly | Gretna | End of season | |
| 1 September 2021 | DF | (Scotland) | Max Johnston | Queen of the South | End of season | |
| 30 September 2021 | FW | (Scotland) | Corey O’Donnell | Albion Rovers | January 2022 | |
| 30 September 2021 | DF | (Scotland) | David Devine | East Fife | End of season | |
| 28 January 2022 | DF | (Republic of Ireland) | Darragh O'Connor | Queen of the South | End of season | |
| 28 February 2022 | GK | (Scotland) | P. J. Morrison | Alloa Athletic | End of season | |

=== Released ===
| Date | Position | Nationality | Name | Joined | Date | Ref. |
|---|---|---|---|---|---|---|
| 11 October 2021 | FW | (Scotland) | Steven Lawless | Dunfermline Athletic | 27 December 2021 | |
| 2 January 2022 | MF | (England) | Mich'el Parker | Linfield | 7 February 2022 | |
| 7 January 2022 | MF | (Scotland) | Robbie Crawford | Partick Thistle | 7 January 2022 | |
| 31 May 2022 | GK | (Scotland) | P. J. Morrison | Falkirk | 9 June 2022 | |
| 31 May 2022 | GK | (New Zealand) | Lawton Green | Greenock Morton | 18 July 2022 | |
| 31 May 2022 | DF | (England) | Liam Grimshaw | Greenock Morton | 12 September 2022 | |
| 31 May 2022 | DF | (France) | Victor Nirennold | Gloucester City | 4 February 2023 | |
| 31 May 2022 | DF | (Republic of Ireland) | Darragh O'Connor | Greenock Morton | 1 June 2022 | |
| 31 May 2022 | MF | (Northern Ireland) | Liam Donnelly | Kilmarnock | 5 July 2022 | |
| 31 May 2022 | MF | (Scotland) | Mark O'Hara | St Mirren | 1 June 2022 | |
| 31 May 2022 | FW | (England) | Justin Amaluzor | Aldershot Town | 16 June 2022 | |
| 31 May 2022 | FW | (England) | Jordan Roberts | Stevenage | 17 June 2022 | |
| 31 May 2022 | FW | (Scotland) | Cody McLeod | Peterhead | 9 July 2022 | |

== Friendlies ==
| 26 June 2021 | Dumbarton | 1–0 | Motherwell | Dumbarton |
| 12:00 BST (UTC+1) | Goal | Report | | Stadium: Dumbarton Football Stadium |

| 10 July 2021 | Millwall | 2–0 | Motherwell | Edinburgh |
| 12:30 BST (UTC+1) | Malone 8'; Smith 60' | | | Stadium: Oriam |

== Competitions ==
=== Overview ===
| Competition | First match | Last match | Starting round | Final position | Record | | | | | | | |
| Competition | First match | Last match | Starting round | Final position | Pld | W | D | L | GF | GA | GD | Win % |
|---|---|---|---|---|---|---|---|---|---|---|---|---|
| Premiership | 1 August 2021 | 14 May 2022 | Matchday 1 | 5th | 38 | 12 | 10 | 16 | 42 | 61 | −19 | 31.58 |
| Scottish Cup | 22 January 2022 | 13 March 2022 | Fourth round | Quarterfinal | 3 | 2 | 0 | 1 | 5 | 4 | +1 | 66.67 |
| League Cup | 14 July 2021 | 14 August 2021 | Group stage | Second round | 5 | 3 | 0 | 2 | 6 | 5 | +1 | 60.00 |
| Total | | | | | 46 | 17 | 10 | 19 | 53 | 70 | −17 | 36.96 |

Last updated: 14 May 2022
Source: Soccerway

=== Premiership ===
==== League table ====
| Pos | Team | Pld | W | D | L | GF | GA | GD | Pts | Qualification or relegation (Note: Teams play each other three times (33 matches), before the league is split into two groups (the top six and the bottom six).) |
|---|---|---|---|---|---|---|---|---|---|---|
| 3 | Heart of Midlothian | 38 | 17 | 10 | 11 | 54 | 44 | +10 | 61 | Qualification for the Europa League play-off round |
| 4 | Dundee United | 38 | 12 | 12 | 14 | 37 | 44 | −7 | 48 | Qualification for the Europa Conference League third qualifying round |
| 5 | Motherwell | 38 | 12 | 10 | 16 | 42 | 61 | −19 | 46 | Qualification for the Europa Conference League second qualifying round |
| 6 | Ross County | 38 | 10 | 11 | 17 | 47 | 61 | −14 | 41 | |
| 7 | Livingston | 38 | 13 | 10 | 15 | 41 | 46 | −5 | 49 | |

Rules for classification: 1) Points; 2) Goal difference; 3) Goals scored; 4) Head-to-head points; 5) Head-to-Head goal difference; 6) Play-off (only if deciding champion, UEFA competitions qualification, second stage group allocation or relegation).

==== Results by round ====
| Round | 1 | 2 | 3 | 4 | 5 | 6 | 7 | 8 | 9 | 10 | 11 | 12 | 13 | 14 | 15 | 16 | 17 | 18 | 19 | 20 | 21 | 22 | 23 | 24 | 25 | 26 | 27 | 28 | 29 | 30 | 31 | 32 | 33 | 34 | 35 | 36 | 37 | 38 |
|---|---|---|---|---|---|---|---|---|---|---|---|---|---|---|---|---|---|---|---|---|---|---|---|---|---|---|---|---|---|---|---|---|---|---|---|---|---|---|
| Ground | H | A | A | H | H | A | H | A | H | A | H | H | A | H | A | H | A | A | H | H | A | H | A | A | H | A | H | A | H | H | A | H | A | H | A | A | H | A |
| Result | L | D | W | W | W | D | W | L | L | L | D | L | W | W | L | W | D | L | W | W | L | D | L | D | L | L | D | D | L | D | L | W | D | L | L | W | W | L |
| Position | 9 | 8 | 7 | 5 | 4 | 4 | 4 | 4 | 6 | 6 | 6 | 7 | 5 | 5 | 5 | 5 | 5 | 5 | 4 | 4 | 4 | 4 | 4 | 4 | 4 | 5 | 5 | 6 | 7 | 8 | 8 | 5 | 6 | 6 | 6 | 5 | 4 | 5 |

Updated to match(es) played on 14 May 2022. Source: SPFL
A = Away; H = Home; W = Win; D = Draw; L = Loss

==== Results summary ====
| Overall | | | | | | | | Home | | | | | | Away | | | | | |
| Pld | W | D | L | GF | GA | GD | Pts | W | D | L | GF | GA | GD | W | D | L | GF | GA | GD |
|---|---|---|---|---|---|---|---|---|---|---|---|---|---|---|---|---|---|---|---|
| 38 | 12 | 10 | 16 | 42 | 60 | −18 | 46 | 9 | 4 | 6 | 26 | 28 | −2 | 3 | 6 | 10 | 16 | 32 | −16 |

Last updated: 14 May 2022.
Source: SPFL

==== Results ====
| 1 August 2021 1 | Motherwell | 2–3 | Hibernian | Motherwell |
| 16:30 BST (UTC+1) | van Veen 12' (yellow card) 55'; Carroll (yellow card) 22'; Mugabi 29'; Slattery (yellow card) 31'; S.O'Donnell (yellow card) 69'; Kelly (yellow card) 70' | Report | Magennis 17'; Hanlon (yellow card) 48'; Doidge 56'; Stevenson (yellow card) 59'; Boyle 70' (pen.); Porteous (yellow card) 76' | Stadium: Fir Park; Attendance: 5,320; Referee: David Munro |

| 8 August 2021 2 | St Johnstone | 1–1 | Motherwell | Perth |
| 15:00 BST | S.O'Donnell 34' (o.g.); Wotherspoon (yellow card) 62'; Craig (yellow card) 67' | Report | Shields (yellow card) 26'; Watt 80'; S.O'Donnell (yellow card) 90' | Stadium: McDiarmid Park; Attendance: 2,169; Referee: Nick Walsh |

| 21 August 2021 3 | Livingston | 1–2 | Motherwell | Livingston |
| 15:00 BST (UTC+1) | Fitzwater (yellow card) 18'; Forrest 38' | Report | Watt 48'; Grimshaw (yellow card) 62' (goal) 79' | Stadium: Almondvale Stadium; Attendance: 1,718; Referee: Craig Napier |

| 28 August 2021 4 | Motherwell | 1–0 | Dundee | Motherwell |
| 15:00 BST (UTC+1) | Watt 34' van Veen (yellow card) 73'; Carroll (red card) 79'; Kelly (yellow card) 80' | Report | McGowan (yellow card) 90+5' | Stadium: Fir Park; Attendance: 4,998; Referee: Willie Collum |

| 11 September 2021 5 | Motherwell | 2–0 | Aberdeen | Motherwell |
| 15:00 BST (UTC+1) | van Veen 26' (yellow card) 27'; Woolery (yellow card) 36'; O'Hara (yellow card) 44'; Ojala 59'; Grimshaw (yellow card) 72'; Watt (yellow card) 83' | Report | Ferguson (yellow card) 58'; McCrorie (yellow card) 90+1'; Brown (yellow card) 90+3' | Stadium: Fir Park; Attendance: 5,623; Referee: John Beaton |

| 19 September 2021 6 | Rangers | 1–1 | Motherwell | Glasgow |
| 15:00 BST (UTC+1) | Sakala 12'; Tavernier (yellow card) 77' | Report | McGinley (yellow card) 19'; Van Veen (yellow card) 37'; Woolery 66'; O'Hara (yellow card) 89' | Stadium: Ibrox Stadium; Attendance: 48,961; Referee: Steven McLean |

| 25 September 2021 7 | Motherwell | 2–1 | Ross County | Motherwell |
| 15:00 BST (UTC+1) | Slattery 2' (yellow card) 62'; Donnelly (yellow card) 78'; Watt 80' (yellow card) 90+1' | Report | Paton (yellow card) 37'; Charles-Cook 39' (yellow card) 41'; Watson (yellow card) 47'; Callachan (yellow card) 90+1' | Stadium: Fir Park; Attendance: 4,477; Referee: Craig Napier |

| 2 October 2021 8 | Hearts | 2–0 | Motherwell | Edinburgh |
| 15:00 BST (UTC+1) | Boyce 5' (penalty missed) 55'; Kingsley 22'; Devlin (yellow card) 43'; Moore (yellow card) 75'; Baningime (yellow card) 83' | Report | Ojala (yellow card) 11'; Grimshaw (yellow card) 18'; McGinley (yellow card) 90+2' | Stadium: Tynecastle Park; Attendance: 17,028; Referee: David Munro |

| 16 October 2021 9 | Motherwell | 0–2 | Celtic | Motherwell |
| 15:00 BST (UTC+1) | Mugabi (yellow card) 90+3' | Report | Jota 17'; Turnbull 52'; Carter-Vickers (yellow card) 80' | Stadium: Fir Park; Attendance: 8,446; Referee: Willie Collum |

| 23 October 2021 10 | Dundee United | 2–1 | Motherwell | Dundee |
| 15:00 BST (UTC+1) | Edwards 35' (yellow card) 89'; Fuchs (yellow card) 73'; Mulgrew 77' | Report | Slattery (yellow card) 34'; Grimshaw (yellow card) 59' van Veen (yellow card) 66'; Watt 70' (pen.); McGinley (yellow card) 85' | Stadium: Tannadice Park; Attendance: 6,854; Referee: Kevin Clancy |

| 27 October 2021 11 | Motherwell | 2–2 | St Mirren | Motherwell |
| 19:45 BST (UTC+1) | Watt 48', 52' (pen.); Goss (yellow card) 90+2' | Report | McAllister (yellow card) 71'; Brophy 74', 78' (pen.) (yellow card) 79' | Stadium: Fir Park; Attendance: 4,576; Referee: Bobby Madden |

| 31 October 2021 12 | Motherwell | 1–6 | Rangers | Motherwell |
| 12:00 BST (UTC+1) | Mugabi 13', (yellow card) 76'; S.O'Donnell (yellow card) 9' (yellow-red card) 67' | Report | Tavernier 43'; Sakala 45+1', 63', 86'; Kamara 75'; Roofe 90+1' | Stadium: Fir Park; Attendance: 7,740; Referee: Nick Walsh |

| 6 November 2021 13 | Aberdeen | 0–2 | Motherwell | Aberdeen |
| 15:00 GMT (UTC±0) | Ferguson (yellow card) 42'; McCrorie (yellow card) 77'; Ojo (yellow card) 90+2' | Report | Maguire (yellow card) 21' van Veen (yellow card) 22' (goal) 50', 57'; Roberts (yellow card) 36'; McGinley (yellow card) 64'; Mugabi (yellow card) 76' | Stadium: Pittodrie Stadium; Attendance: 9,666; Referee: Don Robertson |

| 20 November 2021 14 | Motherwell | 2–0 | Hearts | Motherwell |
| 15:00 GMT (UTC±0) | Shields 23'; Lamie 66'; Watt (yellow card) 90+4' | Report | Moore (yellow card) 48' (yellow-red card) 64' | Stadium: Fir Park; Attendance: 7,908; Referee: Willie Collum |

| 27 November 2021 15 | Dundee | 3–0 | Motherwell | Dundee |
| 15:00 GMT (UTC±0) | McCowan 19'; Mullen 26' (yellow card) 45'; Sweeney 49' (yellow card) 59'; Fontaine (yellow card) 76' | Report | Slattery (yellow card) 10'; Mugabi (yellow card) 58'; Roberts (yellow card) 81' | Stadium: Dens Park; Attendance: 4,747; Referee: Craig Napier |

| 30 November 2021 16 | Motherwell | 1–0 | Dundee United | Motherwell |
| 19:45 GMT (UTC±0) | Watt 12'; Maguire (yellow card) 44' (yellow-red card) 82'; Goss (yellow card) 77'; McGinley (yellow card) 77' | Report | Hoti (yellow card) 71'; Spörle (yellow card) 78' | Stadium: Fir Park; Attendance: 4,287; Referee: Steven McLean |

| 4 December 2021 17 | Hibernian | 1–1 | Motherwell | Edinburgh |
| 15:00 GMT (UTC±0) | Nisbet 33'; Newell (yellow card) 64'; Campbell (yellow card) 74' | Report | Slattery (yellow card) 42'; Watt 60' van Veen (yellow card) 75'; Goss (yellow card) 90+2' | Stadium: Easter Road; Attendance: 15,266; Referee: Colin Steven |

| 12 December 2021 18 | Celtic | 1–0 | Motherwell | Glasgow |
| 15:00 GMT (UTC±0) | Rogic 45+3' | Report | van Veen (yellow card) 20'; Slattery (yellow card) 45+2' | Stadium: Celtic Park; Referee: Euan Anderson |

| 18 December 2021 19 | Motherwell | 2–0 | St Johnstone | Motherwell |
| 15:00 GMT (UTC±0) | Cornelius 17' van Veen 55'; Goss (yellow card) 75' | Report | | Stadium: Fir Park; Attendance: 3,920; Referee: Nick Walsh |

| 26 December 2021 20 | Motherwell | 2–1 | Livingston | Motherwell |
| 15:00 GMT (UTC±0) | van Veen 13', 69' | Report | Sibbald (yellow card) 42'; Longridge (yellow card) 47'; S.Kelly (yellow card) 85'; Anderson 87' | Stadium: Fir Park; Attendance: 500; Referee: Don Robertson |
Note: Capacity limited due to COVID-19 restrictions in Scotland.

| 18 January 2022 21 | Ross County | 3–1 | Motherwell | Dingwall |
| 19:45 GMT (UTC±0) | Johansen 45+4' (o.g.); Tillson (red card) 59'; Charles-Cook (yellow card) 60' (goal) 72', 79' (pen.) | Report | Roberts 55' (yellow card) 60'; S.O'Donnell (yellow card) 63' | Stadium: Victoria Park; Attendance: 2,523; Referee: John Beaton |

| 26 January 2022 23 | Motherwell | 0–0 | Hibernian | Motherwell |
| 19:45 GMT (UTC±0) | Donnelly (yellow card) 57' (yellow-red card) 73'; Johansen (yellow card) 83' van Veen (yellow card) 87' | Report | Stevenson (yellow card) 26'; McGinn (yellow card) 80' | Stadium: Fir Park; Attendance: 5,202; Referee: Andrew Dallas |

| 29 January 2022 24 | Hearts | 2–0 | Motherwell | Edinburgh |
| 15:00 GMT (UTC±0) | Halliday 37'; Simms 58'; Haring (yellow card) 68' | Report | Kelly (yellow card) 4'; Goss (yellow card) 80' | Stadium: Tynecastle Park; Attendance: 17,699; Referee: Craig Napier |

| 1 February 2022 22 | St Mirren | 1–1 | Motherwell | Paisley |
| 19:45 GMT (UTC±0) | Gogić 81' | Report | Slattery (yellow card) 34'; Tierney 90+2' | Stadium: St Mirren Park; Attendance: 4,987; Referee: Euan Anderson |

| 6 February 2022 25 | Motherwell | 0–4 | Celtic | Motherwell |
| 13:30 GMT (UTC±0) | McGinley (yellow card) 40'; Mugabi (yellow card) 83'; Donnelly (yellow card) 86' | Report | Abada 28'; Rogic 31', 45'; Giakoumakis (yellow card) 59' Maeda 71' | Stadium: Fir Park; Attendance: 7,421; Referee: John Beaton |

| 9 February 2022 26 | Dundee United | 2–0 | Motherwell | Dundee |
| 19:45 GMT (UTC±0) | Levitt 29'; Watt 59' | Report | Slattery (yellow card) 26' van Veen (yellow card) 88' | Stadium: Tannadice Park; Attendance: 4,591; Referee: Alan Muir |

| 19 February 2022 27 | Motherwell | 1–1 | Aberdeen | Motherwell |
| 15:00 GMT (UTC±0) | Shields (yellow card) 31'; Mugabi (yellow card) 45+4'; Donnelly (yellow card) 52'; O'Hara 68'; Lamie (yellow card) 90+2' | Report | McCrorie (yellow card) 3'; Besuijen 34'; Gallagher (yellow card) 45+4'; Ferguson (yellow card) 83' | Stadium: Fir Park; Attendance: 5,171; Referee: Nick Walsh |

| 27 February 2022 28 | Rangers | 2–2 | Motherwell | Glasgow |
| 15:00 GMT (UTC±0) | Morelos 22' (yellow card) 56'; Sakala 24'; Tavernier (yellow card) 75' | Report | Efford (yellow card) 28'; Roberts 52'; S.O'Donnell (yellow card) 71'; Woolery 76'; Donnelly (yellow card) 80' | Stadium: Ibrox Stadium; Attendance: 14,380; Referee: Don Robertson |

| 2 March 2022 29 | Motherwell | 0–1 | Ross County | Motherwell |
| 19:45 GMT (UTC±0) | | Report | Hungbo 15' (pen.); Paton (yellow card) 48' | Stadium: Fir Park; Attendance: 3,587; Referee: John Beaton |

| 5 March 2022 30 | Motherwell | 1–1 | Dundee | Motherwell |
| 15:00 GMT (UTC±0) | Efford 18' | Report | McMullan 6'; Daley-Campbell (yellow card) 53'; Byrne (yellow card) 83' | Stadium: Fir Park; Attendance: 4,435; Referee: Andrew Dallas |

| 19 March 2022 31 | St Johnstone | 2–1 | Motherwell | Perth |
| 15:00 GMT (UTC±0) | Davidson (yellow card) 16'; Hendry 21', 90+1'; Rooney (yellow card) 41'; Cleary (yellow card) 45' | Report | van Veen 12' (yellow card) 45+1'; Woolery (yellow card) 85' | Stadium: McDiarmid Park; Attendance: 3,772; Referee: David Munro |

| 2 April 2022 32 | Motherwell | 4–2 | St Mirren | Motherwell |
| 15:00 BST (UTC+1) | Goss 20'; Shields 21'; Cornelius 45'; Tait 78' (o.g.) | Report | Brophy 14'; McCarthy 38'; Power (yellow card) 80' | Stadium: Fir Park; Attendance: 4,441; Referee: Craig Napier |

| 9 April 2022 33 | Livingston | 2–2 | Motherwell | Livingston |
| 15:00 BST (UTC+1) | Bailey 26'; Forrest 58'; S.Kelly (yellow card) 80' | Report | Slattery (yellow card) 61' (goal) 72'; Johansen (yellow card) 90+2'; Lamie 90+3' | Stadium: Almondvale Stadium; Attendance: 3,848; Referee: Don Robertson |

| 23 April 2022 34 | Motherwell | 1–3 | Rangers | Motherwell |
| 12:00 BST (UTC+1) | Ojala (yellow card) 31'; Tierney 35'; Slattery (yellow card) 60'; Mugabi (yellow card) 61' | Report | Kelly 14' (o.g.); Balogun (red card) 28'; Arfield (yellow card) 45'; Wright 47'; Tavernier 62' (pen.) | Stadium: Fir Park; Attendance: 8,036; Referee: Nick Walsh |

| 30 April 2022 35 | Dundee United | 1–0 | Motherwell | Dundee |
| 15:00 BST (UTC+1) | Levitt 37'; Mulgrew (yellow card) 56'; Smith (yellow card) 88'; Spörle (yellow card) 90' | Report | Goss (yellow card) 55'; Mugabi (yellow card) 76'; Slattery (yellow card) 87' | Stadium: Tannadice Park; Attendance: 6,250; Referee: Kevin Clancy |

| 7 May 2022 36 | Ross County | 0–1 | Motherwell | Dingwall |
| 15:00 BST (UTC+1) | Tillson (yellow card) 42'; Iacovitti (yellow card) 90+4' | Report | Ojala (yellow card) 14' van Veen 68' (pen.) (yellow card) 85'; Goss (yellow card) 74' | Stadium: Victoria Park; Attendance: 3,067; Referee: David Munro |

| 11 May 2022 37 | Motherwell | 2–1 | Hearts | Motherwell |
| 19:45 BST (UTC+1) | Efford 3'; Slattery (yellow card) 50'; Lamie 56' | Report | Ginnelly 9' | Stadium: Fir Park; Attendance: 5,769; Referee: Matthew MacDermid |

| 14 May 2022 38 | Celtic | 6–0 | Motherwell | Glasgow |
| 12:15 BST (UTC+1) | Furuhashi 21', 44'; Turnbull 40'; Jota 59'; Giakoumakis 68', 90+1' | Report | Lamie (yellow card) 76' | Stadium: Celtic Park; Referee: Alan Muir |

=== Scottish Cup ===
| 22 January 2022 Fourth Round | Motherwell | 2–1 (a.e.t.) | Greenock Morton | Motherwell |
| 15:00 GMT (UTC±0) | Van Veen 111' (pen.); Donnelly 120+1' | Report | Brandon (yellow card) 26'; Blues (yellow card) 34'; Ledger (yellow card) 80'; Jacobs (yellow card) 103'; Muirhead 105'; Lithgow (yellow card) 113' | Stadium: Fir Park; Attendance: 4,735; Referee: Nick Walsh |

| 12 February 2022 Fifth Round | Motherwell | 2−1 | Aberdeen | Motherwell |
| 15:00 GMT (UTC±0) | Van Veen 34', (yellow card) 35'; Shields 45'; Carroll (yellow card) 83' | Report | Ramirez 3'; Hayes (yellow card) 32'; Gallagher (yellow card) 35'; Brown (yellow card) 69' | Stadium: Fir Park; Attendance: 5,892; Referee: Greg Aitken |

| 13 March 2022 Quarter-final | Motherwell | 1−2 | Hibernian | Motherwell |
| 12:30 GMT (UTC±0) | Mugabi (red card) 2'; Roberts (yellow card) 7'; Efford 43'; McGinley (yellow card) 80'; Lamie (yellow card) 83' | Report | Melkersen (yellow card) 11' (goal) 15', 37'; Jasper (yellow card) 54'; Allan (yellow card) 85'; Macey (yellow card) 90+3' | Stadium: Fir Park; Attendance: 8,126; Referee: Willie Collum |

=== League Cup ===
==== Group stage ====
===== Table =====
| Pos | Team | Pld | W | PW | PL | L | GF | GA | GD | Pts | Qualification | MOT | QPK | QOS | AIR | ANN |
|---|---|---|---|---|---|---|---|---|---|---|---|---|---|---|---|---|
| 1 | Motherwell | 4 | 3 | 0 | 0 | 1 | 6 | 4 | +2 | 9 | Qualification for the second round | — | — | 3–2 | — | 2–0 |
| 2 | Queen's Park | 4 | 2 | 0 | 1 | 1 | 3 | 2 | +1 | 7 | | 0–1 | — | — | 0–0p | — |
| 3 | Queen of the South | 4 | 2 | 0 | 0 | 2 | 9 | 6 | +3 | 6 | | – | 0–1 | — | 4–1 | — |
| 4 | Airdrieonians | 4 | 1 | 1 | 1 | 1 | 4 | 5 | −1 | 6 | | 2–0 | — | — | — | 1–1p |
| 5 | Annan Athletic | 4 | 0 | 1 | 0 | 3 | 3 | 8 | −5 | 2 | | — | 1–2 | 1–3 | — | — |

Rules for classification: 1) goal difference, 2) goals scored, 3) away goals scored, 4) matches won, 5) away matches won, 6) drawing of lots.

===== Results =====
| 14 July 2021 1 | Queen's Park | 0–1 | Motherwell | Falkirk |
| 19:45 BST (UTC+1) | | Report | Lawless 15' | Stadium: Falkirk Stadium; Attendance: 250; Referee: Kevin Clancy |

| 17 July 2021 2 | Motherwell | 3–2 | Queen of the South | Motherwell |
| 15:00 BST (UTC+1) | Watt 48'; Carroll (yellow card) 56'; Lamie 72'; Woolery 74' | Report | R.Paton 40', 45+1'; S.Dunn (yellow card) 67' | Stadium: Fir Park; Attendance: 1,539; Referee: Euan Anderson |

| 21 July 2021 3 | Airdrieonians | 2–0 | Motherwell | Airdrie |
| 19:45 BST (UTC+1) | M.Currie (yellow card) 32'; McCabe 66'; S.McGill 79' | Report | | Stadium: Excelsior Stadium; Attendance: 700; Referee: Don Robertson |

| 24 July 2021 4 | Motherwell | 2–0 | Annan Athletic | Motherwell |
| 15:00 BST (UTC+1) | Donnelly (yellow card) 30'; Amaluzor 39'; Maguire 56' van Veen (yellow card) 62' | Report | Moxon (yellow card) 75' (penalty missed) 79' | Stadium: Fir Park; Attendance: 2,000; Referee: Gavin Duncan |

==== Knockout stage ====
| 14 August 2021 Second round | Dundee | 1–0 | Motherwell | Dundee |
| 15:00BST (UTC+1) | Elliott (yellow card) 52'; Byrne (yellow card) 73'; Ashcroft 78'; Adam (yellow card) 90+1' | Report | Donnelly (yellow card) 34'; Slattery (yellow card) 86' | Stadium: Dens Park; Referee: Kevin Clancy |

== Squad statistics ==
=== Appearances ===
As of match played 14 May 2022

| No. | Pos | Nat | Player | Total | | Premiership | | Scottish Cup | | League Cup | |
| No. | Pos | Nat | Player | Apps | Goals | Apps | Goals | Apps | Goals | Apps | Goals |
|---|---|---|---|---|---|---|---|---|---|---|---|
| 1 | GK | (Scotland) SCO | Liam Kelly | 46 | 0 | 38 | 0 | 3 | 0 | 5 | 0 |
| 2 | DF | (Scotland) SCO | Stephen O'Donnell | 34 | 0 | 26+2 | 0 | 1+1 | 0 | 4 | 0 |
| 3 | DF | (Republic of Ireland) IRL | Jake Carroll | 31 | 0 | 19+6 | 0 | 2 | 0 | 4 | 0 |
| 4 | DF | (Scotland) SCO | Ricki Lamie | 32 | 4 | 20+5 | 3 | 1+1 | 0 | 5 | 1 |
| 5 | DF | (Uganda) UGA | Bevis Mugabi | 33 | 2 | 29+2 | 2 | 2 | 0 | 0 | 0 |
| 6 | MF | (Scotland) SCO | Barry Maguire | 19 | 1 | 11+2 | 0 | 1 | 0 | 5 | 1 |
| 7 | FW | (England) ENG | Kaiyne Woolery | 38 | 3 | 24+7 | 2 | 1+1 | 0 | 4+1 | 1 |
| 8 | MF | (Scotland) SCO | Mark O'Hara | 21 | 1 | 14+5 | 1 | 1 | 0 | 0+1 | 0 |
| 9 | FW | (Netherlands) NED | Kevin van Veen | 39 | 11 | 24+8 | 9 | 2+1 | 2 | 2+2 | 0 |
| 11 | MF | (England) ENG | Liam Shaw | 8 | 0 | 2+5 | 0 | 0+1 | 0 | 0 | 0 |
| 14 | DF | (Finland) FIN | Juhani Ojala | 24 | 1 | 18+3 | 1 | 2 | 0 | 1 | 0 |
| 16 | MF | (England) ENG | Callum Slattery | 34 | 2 | 27+4 | 2 | 0+1 | 0 | 1+1 | 0 |
| 17 | FW | (England) ENG | Justin Amaluzor | 13 | 1 | 2+8 | 0 | 0+1 | 0 | 1+1 | 1 |
| 18 | MF | (Scotland) SCO | Dean Cornelius | 17 | 2 | 10+2 | 2 | 1+1 | 0 | 3 | 0 |
| 19 | DF | (England) ENG | Nathan McGinley | 29 | 0 | 22+2 | 0 | 2 | 0 | 2+1 | 0 |
| 20 | FW | (United States) USA | Joseph Efford | 16 | 3 | 11+3 | 2 | 2 | 1 | 0 | 0 |
| 21 | DF | (Norway) NOR | Sondre Johansen | 25 | 0 | 21+1 | 0 | 3 | 0 | 0 | 0 |
| 22 | MF | (Northern Ireland) NIR | Liam Donnelly | 30 | 1 | 16+7 | 0 | 3 | 1 | 3+1 | 0 |
| 23 | DF | (England) ENG | Liam Grimshaw | 15 | 1 | 10+4 | 1 | 0 | 0 | 1 | 0 |
| 26 | MF | (Republic of Ireland) IRL | Ross Tierney | 15 | 2 | 5+9 | 2 | 0+1 | 0 | 0 | 0 |
| 27 | MF | (Germany) GER | Sean Goss | 31 | 1 | 26+3 | 1 | 2 | 0 | 0 | 0 |
| 28 | FW | (England) ENG | Jordan Roberts | 20 | 2 | 7+11 | 2 | 2 | 0 | 0 | 0 |
| 29 | FW | (Scotland) SCO | Connor Shields | 29 | 3 | 17+8 | 2 | 2+1 | 1 | 1 | 0 |
| 32 | DF | (France) FRA | Victor Nirennold | 3 | 0 | 1+2 | 0 | 0 | 0 | 0 | 0 |
Players away from the club on loan:
| 15 | DF | (Republic of Ireland) IRL | Darragh O'Connor | 5 | 0 | 0+1 | 0 | 0 | 0 | 4 | 0 |
Players who left Motherwell during the season:
| 11 | FW | (Scotland) SCO | Steven Lawless | 6 | 1 | 0+2 | 0 | 0 | 0 | 4 | 1 |
| 20 | MF | (Scotland) SCO | Robbie Crawford | 3 | 0 | 0 | 0 | 0 | 0 | 2+1 | 0 |
| 32 | FW | (Scotland) SCO | Tony Watt | 24 | 10 | 18+1 | 9 | 0 | 0 | 3+2 | 1 |

=== Goal scorers ===
As of match played 14 May 2022

| Ranking | Nation | Position | Number | Name | Scottish Premiership | Scottish Cup | League Cup | Total |
|---|---|---|---|---|---|---|---|---|
| 1 | FW | (Netherlands) | 9 | Kevin van Veen | 9 | 2 | 0 | 11 |
| 2 | FW | (Scotland) | 32 | Tony Watt | 9 | 0 | 1 | 10 |
| 3 | DF | (Scotland) | 4 | Ricki Lamie | 3 | 0 | 1 | 4 |
| 4 | FW | (England) | 7 | Kaiyne Woolery | 2 | 0 | 1 | 3 |
| 4 | FW | (Scotland) | 29 | Connor Shields | 2 | 1 | 0 | 3 |
| 4 | FW | (United States) | 20 | Joseph Efford | 2 | 1 | 0 | 3 |
| 7 | DF | (Uganda) | 5 | Bevis Mugabi | 2 | 0 | 0 | 2 |
| 7 | FW | (England) | 28 | Jordan Roberts | 2 | 0 | 0 | 2 |
| 7 | MF | (Scotland) | 18 | Dean Cornelius | 2 | 0 | 0 | 2 |
| 7 | MF | (England) | 16 | Callum Slattery | 2 | 0 | 0 | 2 |
| 7 | MF | (Republic of Ireland) | 26 | Ross Tierney | 2 | 0 | 0 | 2 |
| 12 | DF | (England) | 23 | Liam Grimshaw | 1 | 0 | 0 | 1 |
| 12 | DF | (Finland) | 14 | Juhani Ojala | 1 | 0 | 0 | 1 |
| 12 | MF | (Scotland) | 8 | Mark O'Hara | 1 | 0 | 0 | 1 |
| 12 | MF | (Germany) | 27 | Sean Goss | 1 | 0 | 0 | 1 |
| 12 | MF | (Northern Ireland) | 22 | Liam Donnelly | 0 | 1 | 0 | 1 |
| 12 | FW | (Scotland) | 11 | Steven Lawless | 0 | 0 | 1 | 1 |
| 12 | FW | (England) | 17 | Justin Amaluzor | 0 | 0 | 1 | 1 |
| 12 | MF | (Scotland) | 6 | Barry Maguire | 0 | 0 | 1 | 1 |
| 12 | | | | Own goal | 1 | 0 | 0 | 1 |
| TOTALS | | | | | 42 | 4 | 6 | 52 |

=== Clean sheets ===
As of match played 14 May 2022

| Ranking | Nation | Position | Number | Name | Scottish Premiership | Scottish Cup | League Cup | Total |
|---|---|---|---|---|---|---|---|---|
| 1 | GK | (Scotland) | 1 | Liam Kelly | 8 | 0 | 2 | 10 |
| TOTALS | | | | | 8 | 0 | 2 | 10 |

=== Disciplinary record ===
As of match played 14 May 2022

| Number | Nation | Position | Name | Premiership | | Scottish Cup | | League Cup | | Total | |
| Number | Nation | Position | Name | Yellow card | Red card | Yellow card | Red card | Yellow card | Red card | Yellow card | Red card |
| 1 | (Scotland) | GK | Liam Kelly | 2 | 0 | 0 | 0 | 0 | 0 | 2 | 0 |
| 2 | (Scotland) | DF | Stephen O'Donnell | 6 | 1 | 0 | 0 | 0 | 0 | 6 | 1 |
| 3 | (Republic of Ireland) | DF | Jake Carroll | 1 | 1 | 1 | 0 | 1 | 0 | 3 | 1 |
| 4 | (Scotland) | DF | Ricki Lamie | 2 | 0 | 1 | 0 | 0 | 0 | 3 | 0 |
| 5 | (Uganda) | DF | Bevis Mugabi | 8 | 0 | 0 | 1 | 0 | 0 | 8 | 1 |
| 6 | (Scotland) | MF | Barry Maguire | 3 | 1 | 0 | 0 | 0 | 0 | 3 | 1 |
| 7 | (England) | FW | Kaiyne Woolery | 2 | 0 | 0 | 0 | 0 | 0 | 2 | 0 |
| 8 | (Scotland) | MF | Mark O'Hara | 2 | 0 | 0 | 0 | 0 | 0 | 2 | 0 |
| 9 | (Netherlands) | FW | Kevin van Veen | 12 | 0 | 1 | 0 | 1 | 0 | 14 | 0 |
| 14 | (Finland) | DF | Juhani Ojala | 3 | 0 | 0 | 0 | 0 | 0 | 3 | 0 |
| 16 | (England) | MF | Callum Slattery | 12 | 0 | 0 | 0 | 1 | 0 | 13 | 0 |
| 19 | (England) | DF | Nathan McGinley | 6 | 0 | 1 | 0 | 0 | 0 | 7 | 0 |
| 20 | (United States) | FW | Joseph Efford | 1 | 0 | 0 | 0 | 0 | 0 | 1 | 0 |
| 21 | (Norway) | DF | Sondre Johansen | 2 | 0 | 0 | 0 | 0 | 0 | 2 | 0 |
| 22 | (Northern Ireland) | MF | Liam Donnelly | 6 | 1 | 0 | 0 | 2 | 0 | 8 | 1 |
| 23 | (England) | DF | Liam Grimshaw | 4 | 0 | 0 | 0 | 0 | 0 | 4 | 0 |
| 27 | (Germany) | MF | Sean Goss | 7 | 0 | 0 | 0 | 0 | 0 | 7 | 0 |
| 28 | (England) | FW | Jordan Roberts | 3 | 0 | 1 | 0 | 0 | 0 | 4 | 0 |
| 29 | (Scotland) | FW | Connor Shields | 2 | 0 | 0 | 0 | 0 | 0 | 2 | 0 |
Players who left Motherwell during the season:
| 32 | (Scotland) | FW | Tony Watt | 3 | 0 | 0 | 0 | 0 | 0 | 3 | 0 |
| | | | TOTALS | 87 | 4 | 5 | 1 | 5 | 0 | 97 | 5 |

== See also ==
- List of Motherwell F.C. seasons
