= 2016–17 Fleetwood Town F.C. season =

Fleetwood Town
2016–17 season
- Chairman: Andy Pilley
- Head Coach: Steven Pressley (till 26 July); Uwe Rosler (from 30 July)
- Stadium: Highbury Stadium
- League One: 4th
- FA Cup: Third round
- EFL Cup: First round
- EFL Trophy: Group stage
Home colours	Away colours

The 2016–17 season was Fleetwood Town's 109th season in their history and third consecutive season in League One. Along with League One, the club also participated in the FA Cup, League Cup and League Trophy.

The season covered the period from 1 July 2016 to 30 June 2017, with competitive matches played between August and May.

== Transfers ==
=== In ===
Date from	Position	Nationality	Name	From	Fee	Ref.
1 July 2016	CB	(Republic of Ireland)	Cian Bolger	Southend United	Free transfer	
1 July 2016	GK	(England)	Alex Cairns	Rotherham United	Free transfer	
1 July 2016	RB	(England)	Michael Duckworth	Hartlepool United	Free transfer	
1 July 2016	CB	(England)	Ashley Eastham	Rochdale	Free transfer	
1 July 2016	CF	(Wales)	Aaron Amadi-Holloway	Wycombe Wanderers	Undisclosed	
1 July 2016	CF	(England)	Ashley Nadesan	Horley Town	Undisclosed	
1 July 2016	GK	(England)	Chris Neal	Port Vale	Free transfer	
1 July 2016	CM	(England)	Elliot Osborne	Nantwich Town	Undisclosed	
1 July 2016	GK	(England)	Matt Urwin	AFC Fylde	Free transfer	
11 July 2016	CF	(England)	Dion Charles	AFC Fylde	Free transfer	
12 July 2016	CM	(Netherlands)	Ricardo Kip	Almere City	Undisclosed	
19 August 2016	LW	(England)	Martyn Woolford	Sheffield United	Free transfer	
22 August 2016	LB	(England)	Spencer Myers	Everton	Free transfer	
22 August 2016	DM	(England)	Oliver Roberts	Stoke City	Free transfer	
7 November 2016	RB	(Nigeria)	Elohor Ekpolo	Barcelona B	Free transfer	
4 January 2017	ST	(England)	Alex Reid	Rushall Olympic	Undisclosed	
12 January 2017	DM	(England)	George Glendon	Manchester City	Undisclosed	
13 January 2017	LB	(England)	Joe Maguire	Liverpool	Undisclosed	
19 January 2017	RW	(Wales)	Wes Burns	Bristol City	Undisclosed	
20 January 2017	RB	(Germany)	Markus Schwabl	Aalen	Undisclosed	

=== Out ===
Date from	Position	Nationality	Name	To	Fee	Ref.
1 July 2016	CF	(Nigeria)	Shola Ameobi	Notts County	Released	(Note: Following Ameobi's release, he signed for Notts County.)
1 July 2016	LB	(England)	Danny Andrew	Grimsby Town	Released	(Note: Following Andrew's release, he signed for Grimsby Town.)
1 July 2016	CB	(England)	Max Cartwright	FC United of Manchester	Released	(Note: Following Cartwright's release, he signed for FC United of Manchester.)
1 July 2016	LB	(England)	Keir Dickson	Free agent	Released	
1 July 2016	GK	(England)	Aleks Gogic	Free agent	Released	
1 July 2016	CM	(England)	Harvey Hodd	Free agent	Released	
1 July 2016	CB	(England)	Stephen Jordan	Chorley	Released	(Note: Following Jordan's release, he signed for Chorley.)
1 July 2016	CF	(Jamaica)	Jamille Matt	Blackpool	Released	(Note: Following Matt's release, he signed for Blackpool.)
1 July 2016	GK	(Wales)	Chris Maxwell	Preston North End	Free transfer	
1 July 2016	GK	(United States)	Brendan Moore	Torquay United	Released	(Note: Following Moore's release, he signed for Torquay United.)
1 July 2016	CB	(England)	Bradley Roscoe	Free agent	Released	
1 July 2016	CM	(England)	Antoni Sarcevic	Shrewsbury Town	Free transfer	
1 July 2016	CM	(England)	Conor Smith	Free agent	Released	
1 July 2016	CB	(England)	Matty Williams	Free agent	Released	
12 July 2016	RB	(England)	Tyler Hornby-Forbes	Brighton & Hove Albion	Undisclosed	
20 July 2016	CB	(Sweden)	Marcus Nilsson	Stabæk	Undisclosed	
16 August 2016	ST	(France)	Vamara Sanogo	Zagłębie Sosnowiec	Free transfer	
20 January 2017	CF	(Wales)	Aaron Amadi-Holloway	Oldham Athletic	Undisclosed	
31 January 2017	CM	(Scotland)	Thomas Grant	Free agent	Released	
31 January 2017	DM	(Iceland)	Eggert Jónsson	SønderjyskE	Undisclosed	

=== Loans in ===
Date from	Position	Nationality	Name	From	Date until	Ref.
12 August 2016	SS	(England)	Chris Long	Burnley	30 January 2017 (Note: On 30 January 2017, Chris Long's loan was terminated.)	
13 August 2016	DM	(England)	George Glendon	Manchester City	2 January 2017	
29 August 2016	CM	(England)	Kyle Dempsey	Huddersfield Town	End of Season	
31 August 2016	CF	(Scotland)	Alex Jakubiak	Watford	End of Season	
31 August 2016	LB	(England)	Kieran Wallace	Sheffield United	End of Season	
2 January 2017	LB	(England)	Ben Davies	Preston North End	End of Season	
27 January 2017	AM	(England)	Cameron Brannagan	Liverpool	End of Season	

=== Loans out ===
Date from	Position	Nationality	Name	To	Date until	Ref.
21 July 2016	CF	(Scotland)	Declan McManus	Raith Rovers	End of Season	
31 August 2016	CM	(Netherlands)	Ricardo Kip	SC Cambuur	End of Season	
30 September 2016	CM	(England)	Elliot Osborne	Tranmere Rovers	28 October 2016	
3 October 2016	DM	(England)	Akil Wright	Barrow (Note: On 9 January 2017, Akil Wright's loan at Barrow was extended until the end of the season.)	7 January 2017	
4 November 2016	CM	(England)	Nick Haughton	Salford City	8 January 2017	
5 December 2016	MF	(England)	Kieran Dunbar	Stalybridge Celtic	2 January 2017	
19 January 2017	CM	(England)	Elliott Osborne	Stockport County	16 February 2017	
31 January 2017	RB	(England)	Michael Duckworth	Morecambe	End of Season	
31 January 2017	CM	(England)	Nick Haughton	Salford City	End of Season	

== Competitions ==
=== Pre-season friendlies ===
13 July 2016 Friendly	Fleetwood Town	0–5	Liverpool	Fleetwood
19:00		Report	Grujić 18'; Woodburn 52'; Lucas 69'; Firmino 70', 90+1'	Stadium: Highbury Stadium

19 July 2016 Friendly	Fortuna Sittard	0–0	Fleetwood Town	Nieuwstadt, Netherlands
19:00 CEST		Report		Stadium: SportparkKrekelzank Voetbalvereniging

20 July 2016 Friendly	AZ Alkmaar	5–0	Fleetwood Town	Nieuwstadt, Netherlands
14:00 CEST	Jónsson 13' (o.g.); Henriksen 23' dos Santos 44'; Johansson 66'; Jahanbakhsh 75'	Report		Stadium: SportparkKrekelzank Voetbalvereniging

23 July 2016 Friendly	Roda JC	1–0	Fleetwood Town	Groesbeek, Netherlands
13:00 CEST	Boysen 70'	Report		Stadium: Sportpark Zuid

26 July 2016 Friendly	Southport	1–3	Fleetwood Town	Blowick
19:45 BST	White 74'	Report	Hunter 2', 27'; Grant 62'	Stadium: Merseyrail Community Stadium

29 July 2016 Friendly	Fleetwood Town	3–4	Wigan Athletic	Fleetwood
19:45	Ball 7', 50'; B. Grant 55'	Report	Power 11'; Burke 35'; Wildschut 37'; Jacobs 52'	Stadium: Highbury Stadium

=== League One ===
==== League table ====
Pos	Team	Pld	W	D	L	GF	GA	GD	Pts	Promotion, qualification or relegation
2	Bolton Wanderers (P)	46	25	11	10	68	36	+32	86	Promotion to the EFL Championship
3	Scunthorpe United	46	24	10	12	80	54	+26	82	Qualification for the League One play-offs (Note: Four teams play for one spot and promotion to the EFL Championship.)
4	Fleetwood Town	46	23	13	10	64	43	+21	82	Qualification for the League One play-offs
5	Bradford City	46	20	19	7	62	43	+19	79	Qualification for the League One play-offs
6	Millwall (O, P)	46	20	13	13	66	57	+9	73	Qualification for the League One play-offs

Source: BBC Sport
Rules for classification: 1) Points; 2) Goal difference; 3) Number of goals scored
(O) Play-off winners; (P) Promoted

==== Matches ====
6 August 2016 1	Northampton Town	1–1	Fleetwood Town	Northampton
15:00 BST	Neal 9' (o.g.); Revell (yellow card) 65'	Report	Nirennold 52'	Stadium: Sixfields Stadium

13 August 2016 2	Fleetwood Town	2–2	Scunthorpe United	Fleetwood
15:00 BST	Jónsson 37'; Ball 51'; Kip (yellow card) 82'	Report	Hopper 63' van Veen 67' (yellow card) 80'	Stadium: Highbury Stadium; Attendance: 2,509

17 August 2016 3	Fleetwood Town	2–0	Oxford United	Fleetwood
19:45 BST	Ball 50'; Grant (yellow card) 59'; Hunter 70'	Report		Stadium: Highbury Stadium; Attendance: 2,614 (395 Oxford supporters)

20 August 2016 4	Bolton Wanderers	2–1	Fleetwood Town	Bolton
15:00 BST	Davies (yellow card) 10'; Madine 51'; Spearing (yellow card) 79'; Vela 84'	Report	Ball 34'; McLaughlin (yellow card) 90+1'	Stadium: Macron Stadium; Attendance: 13,524 (538 Fleetwood supporters); Referee: Darren England

27 August 2016 5	Southend United	0–2	Fleetwood Town	Southend-on-Sea
15:00 BST	Barrett (yellow card) 36'; Demetriou (yellow card) 84'; O'Neill (yellow card) 90+6'	Report	Long 18'; Bell (yellow card) 45'; Jónsson (yellow card) 70'; Hunter 77'	Stadium: Roots Hall

3 September 2016 6	Fleetwood Town	2–0	Coventry City	Fleetwood
15:00 BST	Long 58'; Woolford 71'	Report	Harries (yellow card) 70'	Stadium: Highbury Stadium; Attendance: 3,557; Referee: Mark Haywood

10 September 2016 7	Fleetwood Town	2–2	Charlton Athletic	Fleetwood
15:00 BST	Long 5'; Ball 44'	Report	Magennis 32'; Ngoyo (yellow card) 77'; Novak 87' (yellow card) 90+1'	Stadium: Highbury Stadium; Attendance: 3,371; Referee: Darren Handley (referee)

17 September 2016 8	Rochdale	2–1	Fleetwood Town	Spotland
15:00 BST	Lund 10' (yellow card) 70'; McGahey (yellow card) 23'; Davies 85'; Bunney (yellow card) 88'	Report	McLaughlin (yellow card) 19'; Grant 23' (pen.); Neal (yellow card) 58'; Woolford (yellow card) 81'	Stadium: Spotland Stadium

24 September 2016 9	Fleetwood Town	1–4	Milton Keynes Dons	Fleetwood
15:00 BST	Dempsey (yellow card) 63'; Grant 70'	Report	Colclough 9', 68', (yellow card) 83', (goal) 90' (pen.); Bowditch 61' (pen.)	Stadium: Highbury Stadium; Attendance: 2,518; Referee: Robert Jones

27 September 2016 10	Bradford City	2–1	Fleetwood Town	Bradford
19:45 BST	Cullen (yellow card) 28'; Filipe Morais 45+1'; Clarke 62' (pen.)	Report	Grant 33'; Ball (yellow card) 52'; Jónsson (yellow card) 62'	Stadium: Coral Windows Stadium; Attendance: 16,759; Referee: Graham Salisbury

1 October 2016 11	Fleetwood Town	1–1	Sheffield United	Fleetwood
15:00 BST	Ball 13'; McLaughlin (yellow card) 18'; Long (yellow card) 34'; Neal (yellow card) 58'; Jónsson (yellow card) 79'; Hunter (yellow card) 83'	Report	Ebanks-Landell 90+5' (yellow card) 90+6'	Stadium: Highbury Stadium; Attendance: 4,004; Referee: Andy Haines

15 October 2016 12	Fleetwood Town	2–0	Peterborough United	Fleetwood
15:00 BST	Sowerby 3'; Grant (yellow card) 16' (goal) 65'; Ryan (yellow card) 19'	Report	Baldwin (yellow card) 44'	Stadium: Highbury Stadium; Attendance: 2,711; Referee: Nigel Miller

18 October 2016 13	Chesterfield	0–1	Fleetwood Town	Chesterfield
19:45 BST	O'Neill (yellow card) 51'; Evans (yellow card) 83'; McGinn (yellow card) 90'	Report	McLaughlin 41'; Grant (yellow card) 66'; Bell (yellow card) 70'	Stadium: Proact Stadium; Attendance: 4,598; Referee: Ross Joyce

22 October 2016 14	Millwall	2–1	Fleetwood Town	Bermondsey, London
15:00 BST	Gregory 31' (pen.), 48' (pen.)	Report	Woolford (yellow card) 25'; Hunter 65'; Ryan (yellow card) 81'	Stadium: The Den; Attendance: 8,085; Referee: Carl Boyeson

29 October 2016 15	Fleetwood Town	2–1	Gillingham	Fleetwood
15:00 BST	Ball 19'; Bolger (yellow card) 77'; Hunter 82'	Report	Knott (yellow card) 41'; Herd (yellow card) 45+2'; Hessenthaler 52'	Stadium: Highbury Stadium; Attendance: 2,600; Referee: Richard Clark

1 November 2016 16	Bristol Rovers	2–1	Fleetwood Town	Bristol
19:45 GMT	Lines (yellow card) 50'; Taylor 61'; Montaño 73'	Report	Hunter 4' (yellow card) 9'; Bell (yellow card) 58'	Stadium: Memorial Stadium; Attendance: 10,088; Referee: Charles Breakspear

12 November 2016 17	Port Vale	2–1	Fleetwood Town	Stoke-on-Trent
15:00 GMT	Alnwick (yellow card) 53'; Grant (yellow card) 56' (yellow-red card) 89'; Cicilia 75'; Jones 86'	Report	Ekpolo (yellow card) 36'; Long 52' (red card) 90'	Stadium: Vale Park; Attendance: 3,890; Referee: John Brooks

19 November 2016 18	Fleetwood Town	2–1	Chesterfield	Fleetwood
15:00 GMT	Bell 27'; Bolger (yellow card) 51'; Nirennold 62'; Grant (yellow card) 88'	Report	O'Shea 66' (pen.)	Stadium: Highbury Stadium; Attendance: 2,901; Referee: Seb Stockbridge

22 November 2016 19	Fleetwood Town	3–0	Shrewsbury Town	Fleetwood
19:45 GMT	McLaughlin 38'; Ball 53', 73'	Report	O'Brien (yellow card) 85'	Stadium: Highbury Stadium; Attendance: 2,111; Referee: Graham Salisbury

26 November 2016 20	AFC Wimbledon	2–2	Fleetwood Town	Kingston upon Thames
15:00 GMT	Poleon (yellow card) 31'; Elliott 47'; Parrett 75' (pen.)	Report	Bolger 12'; Davis (yellow card) 75'; McLaughlin 90+2'	Stadium: Kingsmeadow Stadium; Attendance: 4,023; Referee: Lee Swabey

10 December 2016 21	Fleetwood Town	2–1	Walsall	Fleetwood
15:00 GMT	McLaughlin (yellow card) 13'; Hunter 42'; Grant 67'	Report	Chambers (yellow card) 8'; Dobson 76'; Preston (yellow card) 90+2'	Stadium: Highbury Stadium; Attendance: 2,708; Referee: Rob Lewis

17 December 2016 22	Swindon Town	1–1	Fleetwood Town	Swindon
15:00 GMT	Norris 12'; Thompson (yellow card) 17'; Branco (yellow card) 74'	Report	Ball 22'; Pond (yellow card) 51'; Bolger (yellow card) 88'	Stadium: County Ground; Attendance: 6,143; Referee: Darren Deadman

26 December 2016 23	Fleetwood Town	0–0	Bury	Fleetwood
15:00 GMT		Report	Kay (yellow card) 55'; Bedeau (yellow card) 89'	Stadium: Highbury Stadium; Attendance: 4,017; Referee: Nigel Miller

31 December 2016 24	Fleetwood Town	1–0	Oldham Athletic	Fleetwood
15:00 GMT	Ball (yellow card) 71'; McLaughlin (yellow card) 82'; Law 90+1' (o.g.)	Report	Burgess (yellow card) 57'	Stadium: Highbury Stadium; Attendance: 3,189; Referee: Darren Handley

2 January 2017 25	Shrewsbury Town	0–1	Fleetwood Town	Shrewsbury
15:00 GMT	Ogogo (yellow card) 78'	Report	Cole 9'; Nirennold (yellow card) 39'	Stadium: Greenhous Meadow; Attendance: 5,080; Referee: Ross Joyce

14 January 2017 26	Fleetwood Town	3–1	Bristol Rovers	Fleetwood
15:00 GMT	Hunter 13' (yellow card) 78'; Bolger 23'; Ball 82'	Report	Lockyer (yellow card) 45+1'; Bodin 54'; Lines (yellow card) 84'; James (yellow card) 90+3'	Stadium: Highbury Stadium; Attendance: 3,728; Referee: Darren England

21 January 2017 27	Coventry City	0–1	Fleetwood Town	Coventry
15:00 GMT	Clarke (yellow card) 56'	Report	Bolger (yellow card) 58' (goal) 90'; McLaughlin (yellow card) 73'	Stadium: Ricoh Arena; Attendance: 8,129; Referee: Darren Deadman

24 January 2017 28	Sheffield United	0–2	Fleetwood Town	Sheffield
19:45 GMT		Report	McLaughlin 20'; Schwabl (yellow card) 25'; Cole (yellow card) 66' (goal) 67'	Stadium: Bramall Lane; Attendance: 19,012; Referee: Rob Jones

28 January 2017 29	Fleetwood Town	1–1	Southend United	Fleetwood
15:00 GMT	Bolger (yellow card) 64'; McLaughlin (yellow card) 72'; Ball 90'	Report	Wordsworth 37'; Timlin (yellow card) 41'; Atkinson (yellow card) 54'; Thompson (yellow card) 67'	Stadium: Highbury Stadium; Attendance: 2,675; Referee: Eddie Ilderton

4 February 2017 30	Charlton Athletic	1–1	Fleetwood Town	Charlton, London
15:00 GMT	Holmes 37' (yellow card) 69'; Forster-Caskey (yellow card) 44'; Ngoyo (yellow card) 90+2'; Byrne (red card) 90+7'	Report	McLaughlin (yellow card) 45+2'; Bell 90+4'; Eastham (yellow card) 90+5'	Stadium: The Valley; Attendance: 9,916; Referee: Tim Robinson

11 February 2017 31	Fleetwood Town	0–0	Rochdale	Fleetwood
15:00 GMT	Grant (yellow card) 37'; Eastham (yellow card) 76'	Report	Keane (yellow card) 28'; Cannon (yellow card) 85'	Stadium: Highbury Stadium; Attendance: 3,186; Referee: Jeremy Simpson

14 February 2017 32	Fleetwood Town	2–1	Bradford City	Fleetwood
19:45 GMT	Cole 68'; McLaughlin 81'	Report	Hiwula 43'; Vincelot (yellow card) 76'; Marshall (yellow card) 88'	Stadium: Highbury Stadium; Attendance: 3,418; Referee: Ross Joyce

18 February 2017 33	Milton Keynes Dons	0–1	Fleetwood Town	Milton Keynes
15:00 GMT	Downing (yellow card) 83'	Report	Bolger 61'	Stadium: stadium:mk Attendance: 8,278; Referee: Nick Kinseley

25 February 2017 34	Fleetwood Town	3–0	Northampton Town	Fleetwood
15:00 GMT	Cole 42'; Grant 56'; Ball 60'; Hunter (yellow card) 78'	Report	Diamond (yellow card) 74'; McCourt (yellow card) 89'	Stadium: Highbury Stadium; Attendance: 3,361; Referee: Andy Haines

4 March 2017 35	Scunthorpe United	0–2	Fleetwood Town	Scunthorpe
15:00 GMT	Morris (yellow card) 11'; Madden (yellow card) 64'; Dawson (yellow card) 64'	Report	Cole (yellow card) 29' (goal) 41'; Grant 90'	Stadium: Glanford Park; Attendance: 5,541; Referee: Peter Bankes

11 March 2017 36	Fleetwood Town	2–4	Bolton Wanderers	Fleetwood
15:00 GMT	Dempsey 22'; Grant 87'	Report	Le Fondre 17', 78'; Wheater 20' (yellow card) 75'; Beevers 48'	Stadium: Highbury Stadium; Attendance: 5,123; Referee: Paul Tierney

14 March 2017 37	Walsall	0–1	Fleetwood Town	Walsall
19:45 GMT		Report	Bolger 22'	Stadium: The Banks's Stadium; Attendance: 3,890; Referee: Trevor Kettle

18 March 2017 38	Fleetwood Town	0–0	AFC Wimbledon	Fleetwood
15:00 GMT	Schwabl (yellow card) 90+4'	Report	Nightingale (yellow card) 27'	Stadium: Highbury Stadium; Attendance: 3,422; Referee: Mark Brown

25 March 2017 39	Bury	0–0	Fleetwood Town	Bury
15:00 GMT	Mellis (yellow card) 46'	Report	Schwabl (yellow card) 71'; Glendon (yellow card) 90+2'	Stadium: Gigg Lane; Attendance: 4,174; Referee: Kevin Friend

1 April 2017 40	Fleetwood Town	0–1	Swindon Town	Fleetwood
15:00 GMT	Hunter (yellow card) 45'; Davies (yellow card) 52'; Eastham (yellow card) 58'	Report	Branco (yellow card) 44'; Thompson (yellow card) 70'; Ince (yellow card) 77'; Ajose 81'	Stadium: Highbury Stadium; Attendance: 3,128; Referee: David Webb

5 April 2017 41	Oxford United	1–3	Fleetwood Town	Oxford
19:45 GMT	Nelson 8'; Maguire (yellow card) 56'	Report	Grant 6' (pen.); Dempsey (yellow card) 12'; Hunter (yellow card) 38'; Bolger (yellow card) 51'; Eastham 75'; Bell (yellow card) 80'; Ball 87'	Stadium: Kassam Stadium; Attendance: 6,728; Referee: Graham Horwood

8 April 2017 42	Oldham Athletic	2–0	Fleetwood Town	Oldham
15:00 BST	Pond 25' (o.g.); Gerrard (yellow card) 27'; Erwin 55'	Report	Davies (yellow card) 40'; Bolger (yellow card) 66'	Stadium: Boundary Park; Attendance: 3,933; Referee: Nigel Miller

14 April 2017 43	Peterborough United	1–2	Fleetwood Town	Peterborough
15:00 BST	Mackail-Smith 68'	Report	Grant 25'; Eastham 42' (yellow card) 76'; McLaughlin (yellow card) 72'	Stadium: London Road Stadium; Attendance: 5,629; Referee: Eddie Ilderton

17 April 2017 44	Fleetwood Town	1–0	Millwall	Fleetwood
15:00 BST	Davies 45+2'; Nirennold (yellow card) 72'; Glendon (yellow card) 77'	Report		Stadium: Highbury Stadium; Attendance: 3,665; Referee: John Brooks

22 April 2017 45	Gillingham	2–3	Fleetwood Town	Gillingham
15:00 BST	Cairns 38' (o.g.); Donnelly (yellow card) 63' (goal) 65'	Report	Pond (yellow card) 39'; Hunter 54'; Ball 80'; Dempsey 90+2'	Stadium: Priestfield Stadium; Attendance: 8,760; Referee: Chris Sarginson

30 April 2017 46	Fleetwood Town	0–0	Port Vale	Fleetwood
12:00 BST	McLaughlin (yellow card) 6'; Bell (yellow card) 45+4'	Report	Reeves (yellow card) 36'; Turner (yellow card) 45'; Purkiss (yellow card) 75'	Stadium: Highbury Stadium; Attendance: 4,733; Referee: Ross Joyce

==== Play-offs ====
4 May 2017 Semi-final first leg	Bradford City	1–0	Fleetwood Town	Bradford
19:45 BST	McArdle 77'	Report	Schwabl (yellow card) 23'	Stadium: Valley Parade; Attendance: 15,696; Referee: Oliver Langford

7 May 2017 Semi-final second leg	Fleetwood Town	0–0 (0–1 agg.)	Bradford City	Fleetwood
17:30 BST		Report		Stadium: Highbury Stadium; Attendance: 5,076; Referee: David Coote

=== FA Cup ===
7 November 2016 First round	Southport	0–0	Fleetwood Town	Southport
19:45 GMT	Caton (yellow card) 42'; Thompson (yellow card) 55'	Report	Bolger (yellow card) 22'; Ekpolo (yellow card) 35'	Stadium: Haig Avenue; Referee: Darren England

15 November 2016 First round replay	Fleetwood Town	4–1 (a.e.t.)	Southport	Fleetwood
19:45 GMT	Amadi-Holloway 34'; Bolger 94'; Hunter 96'; Bell 101'	Report	Grimes 87'	Stadium: Highbury Stadium; Attendance: 1,609; Referee: David Webb

3 December 2016 Second round	Shrewsbury Town	0–0	Fleetwood Town	Shrewsbury
15:00 GMT	Adam El-Abd (yellow card) 31'; Toney (yellow card) 62'; McGivern (yellow card) 69'; Jones (yellow card) 90+2'	Report	Davis (yellow card) 62'; Grant (yellow card) 68'	Stadium: Greenhous Meadow; Attendance: 2,886; Referee: Trevor Kettle

13 December 2016 Second round replay	Fleetwood Town	3–2	Shrewsbury Town	Fleetwood
19:45 GMT	Pond (yellow card) 59'; Cole 63', 77'; Hunter 90+5'	Report	O'Brien 43' (yellow card) 68'; El-Abd (red card) 50'; Dodds 60'; Toney (yellow card) 77'; Deegan (yellow card) 90+4'	Stadium: Highbury Stadium; Attendance: 1,157; Referee: Mark Heywood

7 January 2017 Third round	Bristol City	0–0	Fleetwood Town	Bristol
15:00 GMT		Report		Stadium: Ashton Gate Stadium; Attendance: 10,301; Referee: Stephen Martin

17 January 2017 Third round replay	Fleetwood Town	0–1	Bristol City	Fleetwood
19:45 GMT	Hunter (yellow card) 90+4'	Report	Paterson 17' (yellow card) 33'; Hegeler (yellow card) 77'; Bryan (yellow card) 87'	Stadium: Highbury Stadium; Attendance: 2,115; Referee: Carl Boyeson

=== EFL Cup ===
10 August 2016 First round	Fleetwood Town	2–2 (a.e.t.) (4–5 p)	Leeds United	Fleetwood
19:45 BST	Amadi-Holloway 13'; Pond (yellow card) 82'; Eastham (yellow card) 94'; Hunter 111'	Report	Ronaldo (yellow card) 20'; Bartley (yellow card) 78'; Bamba (yellow card) 82'; Antonsson 90'; Wood 94' (pen.)	Stadium: Highbury Stadium; Attendance: 3,322
	Penalties
	Grant (penalty scored); Ryan (penalty scored); McLaughlin (penalty scored); Hunter (penalty scored); Jónsson (penalty missed)		Wood (penalty scored); Antonsson (penalty scored); Mowatt (penalty scored); Phillips (penalty scored); Hernández (penalty scored)

=== EFL Trophy ===
Pos	Div	Team	Pld	W	PW	PL	L	GF	GA	GD	Pts	Qualification
1	L2	Carlisle United	3	3	0	0	0	11	6	+5	9	Advance to Round 2
2	L1	Oldham Athletic	3	1	1	0	1	8	7	+1	5	Advance to Round 2
3	L1	Fleetwood Town	3	1	0	0	2	3	6	−3	3	
4	ACA	Blackburn Rovers U21	3	0	0	1	2	2	5	−3	1	

Source: Sky Sports

30 August 2016 Group Stage Game 1	Fleetwood Town	1–0	Blackburn Rovers U23	Fleetwood
19:45 BST	Grant (yellow card) 42'; Cole 45+2'; Hunter (yellow card) 85'		Wharton (yellow card) 50'	Stadium: Highbury Stadium; Attendance: 392; Referee: Ross Joyce

4 October 2016 Group Stage Game 2	Fleetwood Town	0–2	Oldham Athletic	Fleetwood
19:45 BST		Report	Reckord (yellow card) 19'; Green (yellow card) 21'; Mckay 32'; Erwin 38' (yellow card) 62'	Stadium: Highbury Stadium; Attendance: 793; Referee: Darren Bond

9 November 2016 Group Stage Game 3	Carlisle United	4–2	Fleetwood Town	Carlisle
19:45 GMT	McKee 14'; Wyke 18'; Grainger 41' (pen.); Salkeld 73'	Report	Sowerby 48'; Jakubiak 64'	Stadium: Brunton Park; Attendance: 1,420; Referee: Chris Sarginson
