= Bo Sundqvist =

Swedish physicist (born 1941)

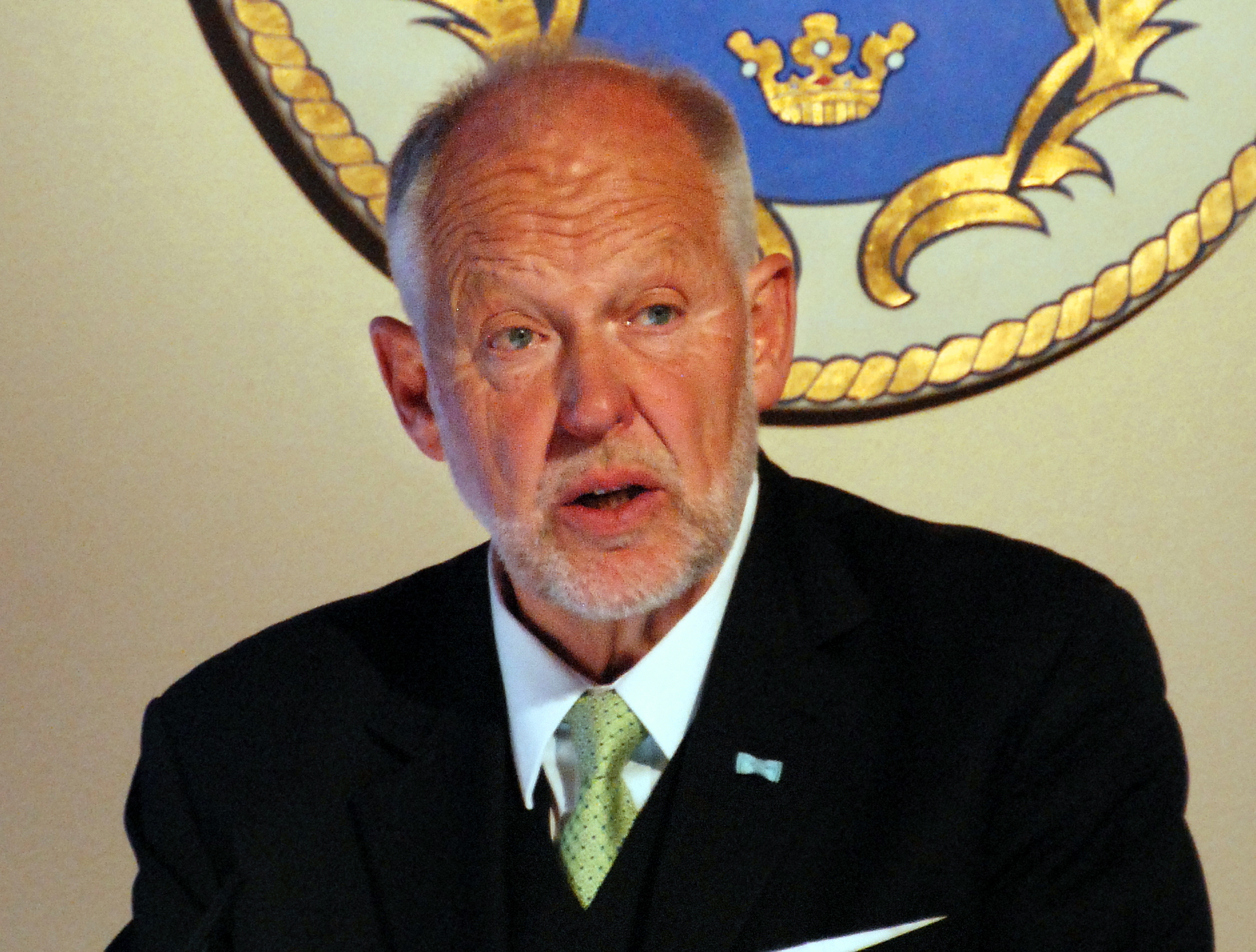
- Bo Sundqvist in 2009
- Born: 21 September 1941 (age 84)
- Education: Uppsala University
- Scientific career
- Fields: physics
- Workplaces: Uppsala University
- Doctoral students: Roman Zubarev, David Fenyő

Bo Ulf Robert Sundqvist (born 21 September 1941) is a Swedish physicist and former rector magnificus of Uppsala University.

Sundqvist was educated at Uppsala University, where he received his PhD in Nuclear Physics. He was appointed professor of Ion physics in 1987, and elected rector magnificus in 1997, a position he held until his retirement on 30 June 2006. He was president of the Association of Swedish Higher Education, a co-operative body for more than 40 institutions of higher education in Sweden, in 2005–2006.

He is a member of the Royal Swedish Academy of Sciences, and was the president of the academy from 1 July 2006 until 30 June 2009. He is also a member of the Royal Swedish Academy of Engineering Sciences, the Royal Society of Sciences in Uppsala, and the Royal Danish Academy of Sciences and Letters.

Academic offices
Preceded by Stig Strömholm	Rector of Uppsala University; 1 July 1997 – 30 June 2006	Succeeded by Anders Hallberg
