= Mary Ann Beavis =

Canadian scholar

- Born: July 26, 1955 (age 70)
- Education: University of Cambridge (PhD); University of Notre Dame (MA); University of Manitoba (MA&BEd)
- Scientific career
- Fields: Christian origins religion and popular culture women and religion
- Institutions: St. Thomas More College

Mary Ann Beavis (born July 26, 1955) is a professor emerita, St. Thomas More College, the University of Saskatchewan. She co-founded the peer-reviewed academic journal, S/HE: An International Journal of Goddess Studies, together with Helen Hye-Sook Hwang in 2021.

== Books ==
- The First Christian Slave: Onesimus in Context. Eugene, OR: Cascade, 2021.
- What Does the Bible Say? A Critical Conversation with Popular Culture in a Biblically Illiterate World. Eugene, OR: Cascade, 2017. Co-authored with HyeRan Kim-Cragg.
- 1–2 Thessalonians. Wisdom Commentaries. Co-authored with Florence Gillman and HyeRan Kim-Cragg. Collegeville, MN: Liturgical Press, 2016.
- The Epistle to the Hebrews: Wisdom Commentaries. Collegeville, MN: Liturgical Press, 2015. Co-authored with HyeRan Kim-Cragg.
- Christian Goddess Spirituality: Enchanting Christianity. New York: Routledge, 2015.
- The Gospel of Mark. Paideia Commentaries on the New Testament. Grand Rapids, MI: Baker Academic, 2011.
- Jesus and Utopia: Looking for the Kingdom of God in the Roman Empire. Minneapolis: Fortress Press, 2006.
- Mark’s Audience: Literary and Social Aspects of Mark 4:11–12. JSNTSS 33; Sheffield: Academic, 1989.

== Edited works ==
- Co-editor with Ally Kateusz. Rediscovering the Marys: Maria, Mariamne, Miriam. London: T. & T. Clark, 2020.
- Co-editor with Helen Hye-Sook Hwang. Goddesses in Myth, History and Culture. Lytle Creek, CA: Mago Books, 2018. ISBN 1-97633-102-1.
- Co-editor with Helen Hye-Sook Hwang. Celebrating Seasons of the Goddesses. Mago Books, 2017. ISBN 1-52330-559-2.
- Co-editor with Michael Gilmour. Dictionary of the Bible and Western Culture. Sheffield: Phoenix Press, 2012.
- Editor. Feminist Theology with a Canadian Accent: Canadian Contextual Feminist Theology. Ottawa: Novalis, 2008.
- Coeditor with Moira Day. Theatre Research in Canada 27,3 (2006). Special Issue on Religion and Theatre in Canada.
- Editor. The Lost Coin: Parables of Women, Work and Wisdom. The Biblical Seminar 86; Sheffield: Academic/Continuum, 2002.

== Referred articles ==
- “Goddesses in Every Girl? Goddess Feminism and Children’s Literature.” S/he: An International Journal of Goddess Studies 1,1 (2022) 115–38.
- “Six Years a Slave: The Confessio of St. Patrick as Slave Narrative.” Irish Theological Quarterly 2020, 85,4 (2020) 339–51.
- “Slaves Obey Your Masters according to the Flesh (Col 3:22a; Eph 6:5a) in Servile Perspective.” Listening: Journal of Communication Ethics, Religion, and Culture 56 (2021) 251-61.
- “The Parable of the Talents (Matthew 25:14–30): Imagining A Slave’s Perspective.” Journal of the Gospels and Acts Research 2 (October 2018) 7–21.
- “The Parable of the Slave, Son and Vineyard: A Freedman’s Narrative. Catholic Biblical Quarterly 80,3 (October 2018) 655-69.
- “From Holy Grail to Lost Gospel: Margaret Starbird and Mary Magdalene Scholarship.” Journal of Religion and Popular Culture 27,3 (2015) 236–49.
- “Christian Goddess Spirituality and Thealogy.” Feminist Theology 24,2 (2016) 125–38.
- “Mary of Bethany and a Hermeneutic of Remembrance.” Catholic Biblical Quarterly 22 (2013) 739-55.
- “The Deification of Mary Magdalene.” Feminist Theology 21,2 (2012) 145–54.
- “The Cathar Mary Magdalene and the Sacred Feminine: Pop Culture Legend vs. Medieval Doctrine.” Journal of Religion and Popular Culture 24:3 (2012) 419–31.
- “Reconsidering Mary of Bethany.” Catholic Biblical Quarterly 74,2 (2012) 281–97.
- “Five Filmic Utopias at the Turn of the Millennium.” Journal of Contemporary Thought: Special Issue on Utopias Today! (July 2010).
- “The Resurrection of Jephthah’s Daughter: Judges 11:34–40 and Mark 5:21–24, 35–43.” Catholic Biblical Quarterly 72 (2010) 46–62.
- “Christian Origins, Egalitarianism and Utopianism.” Journal for the Feminist Study of Religion 23.2 (2007) 27–50.
- “Still Crazy: An Unsung Homage to the New Testament.” Journal of Religion and Film 8,2 (October 2004) http://avalon.unomaha.edu/jrf/Vol8No2/crazy.htm.
- “Philo’s Therapeutai: Philosopher’s Dream or Utopian Construct?” Journal for the Study of the Pseudepigrapha. 14,1 (2004) 30–42.
- “A Daughter in Israel: Celebrating Bat Jephtha (Judges 11:39d-40).” Feminist Theology 13 (2004) 11–25.
- “The Kingdom of God, ‘Utopia’ and Theocracy.” Journal for the Study of the Historical Jesus 2.1 (2004) 91–106.
- “‘Angels Carrying Savage Weapons’: Uses of the Bible in Horror Films.” Journal of Religion and Film 7.2 (2003) https://digitalcommons.unomaha.edu/jrf/vol7/iss2/2/.
- “‘I like the bird’: Avian Metaphors and Feminist Theology.” Feminist Theology 12 (2003) 118-27.
- “‘Prey for Us’: Biblical/Theological Themes in a ‘Cult’ TV Sci-Fi Drama.” Journal of Religion and Popular Culture 1 (2002). http://www.usask.ca/relst/jrpc/articles.html
- “The Power of Jesus’ Parables: Were They Polemical or Irenic?” Journal for the Study of the New Testament 82 (2001): 3–30.
- “‘Pluck the rose but shun the thorns’: The Ancient School and Christian Origins.” Studies in Religion/Sciences religieuses 29,4 (2000): 411–23.
- “The Sweet Hereafter: Law, Wisdom and Family Revisited.” Journal of Religion and Film 4,3 (2000). http://www.unomaha.edu/~wwwjrf/sweether.htm
- “Fargo: A Biblical Morality Play.” Journal of Religion and Film 4,2 (2000). http://www.unomaha.edu/~wwwjrf/vol4no2.htm
- “From the Margin to the Way: A Feminist Reading of the Story of Bartimaeus.” Journal of Feminist Studies in Religion 14, 1 (1998) 19–39.
- “‘Expecting Nothing in Return’: Luke’s Picture of the Marginalized.” Interpretation 48 (1994) 357-68.
- “Ancient Slavery as an Interpretive Context for the Servant Parables, with Special Reference to the Unjust Steward.” Journal of Biblical Literature 111 (1992) 37–54.
- “Parable and Fable.” Catholic Biblical Quarterly 52 (1990) 473-98.
- “Women as Models of Faith in Mark.” Biblical Theology Bulletin 18 (1988) 3–9.
- “Anti-Egyptian Polemic in the Letter of Aristeas 130–165 (The High Priest’s Discourse).” Journal for the Study of Judaism 28 (1988) 145-51.
- “The Trial before the Sanhedrin (Mark 14:53–65, Reader Response, and Greco-Roman Readers).” Catholic Biblical Quarterly 49 (1987) 581-96.
- “Mark’s Teaching on Faith.” Biblical Theology Bulletin 16 (1986) 139-42.

== Other articles ==
- Coauthored with Chris Klassen and Scott Dunbar. “The Journal of Religion and Popular Culture: More than Old Wine in New Bottles.” Religion 43,3 (2013) 421–33.
- “Who is Mary Magdalene?” Christian Reflection: A Series in Faith and Ethics. Women in the Bible (ed. Robert B. Kruschwitz; Waco: Baylor University Press, 2013) 23–29.
- “Listening to Mark: A Response to McVann, Cardwell, Chapman, Sánchez—And a Suggestion.” Listening: Journal of Communication Ethics, Religion, and Culture 47,3 (2012) 264–75.
- “‘Like Rachel and Leah:’ The Mothers of Genesis,” The Bible Today 50,3 (May/June 2012) 151-58.
- “‘Like yeast a woman took’: Feminist Interpretations of the Parables,” Review and Expositor 109,2 (Spring 2012) 219–31.
- “I Commend to You Our Sister: Women in Romans 16.” The Bible Today 45 (July 2008). 227-32. Invited by editor.
- “The Dangerous Gospel: Women in the Gospel of Luke.” The Bible Today 44 (January/February 2007) 28–32. Invited by editor.
- “The Theme of Child Sacrifice in the Work of Canadian Women Authors,” SBL Forum 4,1 (January 2006). http://www.sbl-site.org/publications/article.aspx?articleId=476 .
- “‘She had heard about Jesus’: Women Listening to the Gospel of Mark.” The Bible Today 43 (January/February 2006) 25–29. Invited by editor.
- “The New Covenant and Judaism.” The Bible Today 22 (1984) 24–30.

== Book chapters ==
- “Which Mary, and Why It Matters.” Rediscovering the Marys, 25–38.
- “From Holy Grail to The Lost Gospel: Margaret Starbird and the Mary Magdalene Romance.” Rediscovering the Marys, 227-34.
- “From Skepticism to Piety: The Bible in Horror Films.” The Bible in Motion: A Handbook of the Bible and its Reception in Film (ed. Rhonda Burnette-Bletsch; Berlin: De Gruyter, 2016), 223–36.
- “Freedom and Slavery.” Oxford Encyclopedia of the Bible (ed. Samuel E. Balentine; Oxford: Oxford University Press, 2014). Oxford Reference, 6 pp.
- “‘You Give them Something to Eat’ (Mark 6:37): Beyond a Hermeneutic of Hunger.” In Sheila E. McGinn, Lai Ling Ngan and Ahida Pilarski, eds. By Bread Alone: The Bible through the Eyes of the Hungry (Minneapolis: Fortress, 2014), 95–112.
- “2 Thessalonians.” Women’s Bible Commentary, Newly Revised and Updated (ed. Carol A. Newsom Sharon H. Ringe and Jacqueline E. Lapsley; Louisville, LY: Westminster John Knox Press, 2012) 592-94.
- “Jesus of Montreal.” The Bible and Cinema: Fifty Key Films (ed. Adele Reinhartz; London/New York: Routledge, 2012) 145-49.
- “Jesus in Utopian Context.” Tom Holmén (ed.), Jesus in Continuum (Wissenschaftliche Untersuchungen zum Neuen Testament Reihe A; Tübingen: Mohr, 2011) 133-52.
- “Pseudapocrypha: Invented Scripture in Apocalyptic Horror Films.” In John Walliss and Lee Quinby, eds. Reel Revelations: Apocalypse and Film, 75–90. Sheffield: Sheffield Phoenix, 2010.
- “Jesus of Canada? Four Canadian Constructions of the Christ Figure.” In Ellen Leonard and Kate Merriman, eds. From Logos to Chrisos: Essays on Christology in Honour of Joanne McWilliam, 19–37. Editions SR 34; Waterloo, ON: Wilfrid Laurier University Press.
- “Feminist (and other) Reflections on the Woman with Seven Husbands (Mark 12:20–23.” In Ruben Zimmermann, ed. Hermeneutik der Gleichnisse Jesus: Methodische Neuansätze zum Verstehen urchristlicher Parabeltexte, 603-17.Wissenschaftliche Untersuchungen zum Neuen Testament 213; Tübingen: Mohr Siebeck, 2008.
- “Introduction.” Mary Ann Beavis, ed. Feminist Theology with a Canadian Accent: Canadian Contextual Feminist Theology, 1–22. Ottawa: Novalis, Spring 2008.
- “The Influence of Feminist Theology of Canadian Women Artists.” In Mary Ann Beavis, ed. Feminist Theology with A Canadian Accent: Canadian Contextual Feminist Theology, 291–308. Ottawa: Novalis, 2008.
- “The Aqedah, Jephtha’s Daughter, and the Theme of Child Sacrifice in the Work of Canadian Women Authors.” In Mary Ann Beavis, ed. Feminist Theology with A Canadian Accent: Canadian Contextual Feminist Theology, 353-70. Ottawa: Novalis, Spring 2008.
- “Christianity without Christ: Historical Jesus Scholarship and Feminist Theology/Thealogy.” In Amy-Jill Levine, ed., Feminist Companion to the New Testament: The Historical Jesus (London/New York: Continuum, forthcoming). Invited by editor.
- “Introduction: Seeking the ‘Lost Coin’ of Parables about Women.” In Mary Ann Beavis, ed., The Lost Coin: Parables of Women, Work and Wisdom.” London/New York: Sheffield/Continuum, 2002, 17–33.
- “Joy in Heaven, Sorrow on Earth: Luke 15.10.” In Mary Ann Beavis, ed., The Lost Coin: Parables of Women, Work and Wisdom.” London/New York: Sheffield/Continuum, 2002, 39–45.
- “‘Making Up Stories: A Feminist Reading of the Parable of the Prodigal Son (Lk. 15.11b-32).” In Mary Ann Beavis, ed., The Lost Coin: Parables of Women, Work and Wisdom.” London/New York: Sheffield/Continuum, 2002, 98–123.
- “Jezebel Speaks: Naming the Goddess in the Book of Revelation.” In Amy-Jill Levine, ed., Feminist Companion to the Apocalypse of John. Sheffield: Sheffield Phoenix.
- “‘If any one will not work, let them not eat’: 2 Thessalonians 3.10 and the Social Support of Women.” In Amy-Jill Levine, ed., A Feminist Companion to the Deutero-Pauline Epistles, 29–36. London/New York: T. & T. Clark, 2003.
- “‘Expecting Nothing in Return’: Luke’s Picture of the Marginalized.” In Jack Dean Kingsbury, ed., Gospel Interpretation: Narrative-Critical and Social-Scientific Approaches, 142-54. Harrisburg, PA: Trinity Press International, 1997. Reprint of Interpretation article (see above).
- “The Parable of the Foolish Landowner.” In G. Shillington, ed., Jesus and His Parables (Edinburgh: T. & T. Clark, 1997), 55–68.
- “2 Thessalonians.” In Elisabeth Schüssler Fiorenza, ed., Searching the Scriptures: A Feminist Commentary (New York: Crossroad, 1994) 601-10.

== See also ==
- Pheme Perkins
- Parable of the Lost Coin
- Journal of Religion and Popular Culture
