= Bevis Mugabi =

Footballer (born 1995)

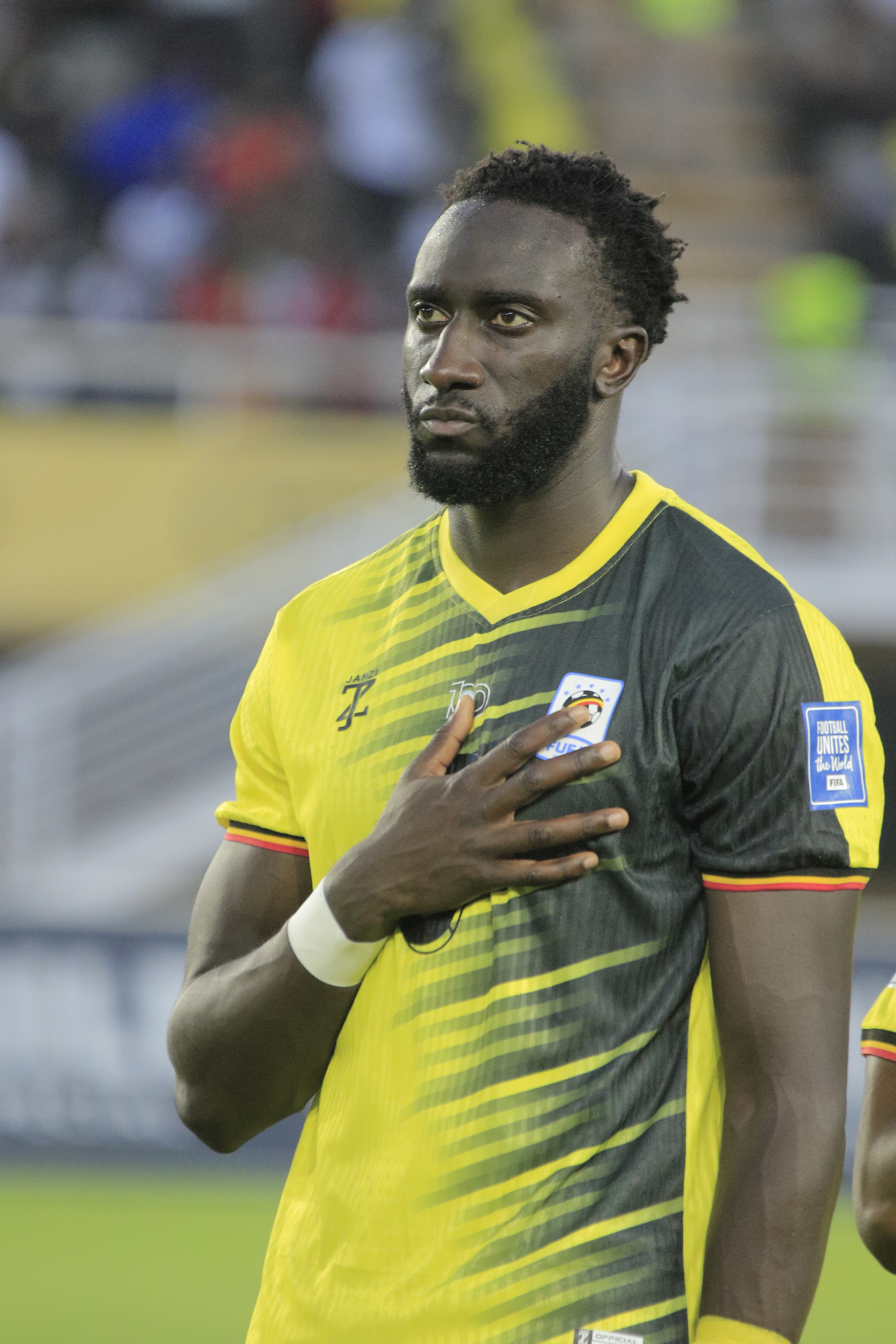
- Mugabi with Uganda in 2025

Personal information
- Full name: Bevis Kristofer Kizito Mugabi
- Date of birth: 1 May 1995 (age 31)
- Place of birth: Harrow, England
- Height: 6 ft 2 in (1.87 m)
- Position: Defender

Team information
- Current team: Carlisle United
- Number: 26

Youth career
- –2011: Fulham
- 2011–2016: Southampton

Senior career*
Years	Team	Apps	(Gls)
2016–2019	Yeovil Town	85	(4)
2019–2024	Motherwell	109	(7)
2024–2025	Anorthosis Famagusta	16	(1)
2025–	Carlisle United	27	(2)

International career^{‡}
2018–	Uganda	28	(1)
- * Club domestic league appearances and goals as of 15:00, 2 September 2026 (UTC) ‡ National team caps and goals as of 21:57, 23 August 2025 (UTC)

Bevis Kristofer Kizito Mugabi (born 1 May 1995) is a professional footballer who plays as a defender for National League club Carlisle United. Born in England, he represents the Uganda national team.

He has previously played in the English Football League for Yeovil Town, in the Scottish Premiership for Motherwell and in the Cypriot First Division for Anorthosis Famagusta.

== Early and personal life ==
Mugabi was born in Harrow, London, to parents from Kampala, Uganda.

== Club career ==
=== Early career ===
Mugabi started his career with Fulham before joining Southampton's youth system in July 2011, and signed a new two-and-a-half-year contract with the club in February 2015.

=== Yeovil Town ===
He signed for League Two club Yeovil Town on 5 August 2016 on a one-year contract. He made his first-team debut on 9 August 2016, as a 54th-minute substitute in an EFL Cup match against Walsall. Mugabi scored his first goal for Yeovil in an EFL Trophy tie against Portsmouth on 30 August 2016. He signed a new two-year contract with the club in May 2017.

At the end of the 2018–19 season, Mugabi was released by Yeovil following the club's relegation from League Two.

=== Motherwell ===
On 12 September 2019, Mugabi signed for Motherwell on a contract until January 2020. After Motherwell teammate Charles Dunne was injured, Mugabi was set to make his debut sooner than expected. On 22 November 2019, Motherwell announced that they had extended their contract with Mugabi until the summer of 2021.

On 18 February 2022, Mugabi signed a new contract with Motherwell, until the summer of 2024. Mugabi was released at the end of the 2023–24 season, having made 125 appearances for the club.

=== Anorthosis Famagusta ===
On 29 July 2024, Mugabi signed a one-year contract with Cypriot First Division team Anorthosis Famagusta.

=== Carlisle United ===
In July 2025 he returned to England, signing for Carlisle United.

== International career ==
Mugabi was eligible to represent England or Uganda at international level.

In August 2016, Mugabi received his first call up to the Uganda national team for their friendly against Kenya and their 2017 Africa Cup of Nations qualification match against Comoros, but Mugabi was withdrawn from the squad by Yeovil Town with the club citing the short notice of the call-up as the reason for his withdrawal. In March 2018, Mugabi received a second call up to the Uganda national team for two international friendlies. Mugabi made his international debut for Uganda on 24 March 2018 in their 3–1 friendly victory over São Tomé and Príncipe. Mugabi returned to the national team after a year long absence when he was included in Uganda's squad for the 2019 Africa Cup of Nations.

== Career statistics ==
=== Club ===
As of end of 2025–26 season

Appearances and goals by club, season and competition
Club	Season	League			National Cup (Note: Includes FA Cup, Scottish Cup, Cypriot Cup)		League Cup (Note: Includes EFL Cup, Scottish League Cup)		Other		Total	
Club	Season	Division	Apps	Goals	Apps	Goals	Apps	Goals	Apps	Goals	Apps	Goals
Yeovil Town	2016–17	League Two	31	1	1	0	2	0	5 (Note: Appearances in EFL Trophy)	1	39	2
Yeovil Town	2017–18	League Two	22	2	2	0	0	0	4	0	28	2
Yeovil Town	2018–19	League Two	32	1	1	0	0	0	2	0	35	1
Yeovil Town	Total		85	4	4	0	2	0	11	1	102	5
Motherwell	2019–20	Scottish Premiership	10	0	1	0	0	0	0	0	11	0
Motherwell	2020–21	Scottish Premiership	23	2	1	0	1	0	2 (Note: Appearances in the UEFA Europa League)	0	27	2
Motherwell	2021–22	Scottish Premiership	31	2	2	0	0	0	0	0	33	2
Motherwell	2022–23	Scottish Premiership	13	1	0	0	1	0	2 (Note: Appearances in the UEFA Europa Conference League)	0	16	1
Motherwell	2023–24	Scottish Premiership	32	2	2	0	4	0	0	0	38	2
Motherwell	Total		109	7	6	0	6	0	4	0	125	7
Anorthosis Famagusta	2024–25	Cypriot First Division	16	1	1	1	—		—		17	2
Carlisle United	2025–26	National League	26	2	0	0	—		2 (Note: One appearance in FA Trophy, one appearance in National League play-offs)	0	28	2
Career total			236	14	11	1	8	0	17	1	272	16

=== International ===
As of match played 25 March 2025

Appearances and goals by national team and year
National team	Year	Apps	Goals
Uganda	2018	2	0
Uganda	2019	8	0
Uganda	2021	2	0
Uganda	2022	3	0
Uganda	2023	3	0
Uganda	2024	8	1
Uganda	2025	2	0
Total		28	1

As of match played 25 March 2025
Scores and results list Uganda's goal tally first, score column indicates score after each Mugabi goal.

List of international goals scored by Bevis Mugabi
No.	Date	Venue	Cap	Opponent	Score	Result	Competition
1	11 October 2024	Mandela National Stadium, Bweyogerere, Uganda	33	South Sudan	1–0	1–0	2025 Africa Cup of Nations qualification

== Honours ==
Southampton

- U21 Premier League Cup: 2014–15
