= Isotopic resonance hypothesis =

The isotopic resonance hypothesis (IsoRes) postulates that certain isotopic compositions of chemical elements affect kinetics of chemical reactions involving molecules built of these elements. The isotopic compositions for which this effect is predicted are called resonance isotopic compositions.

Fundamentally, the IsoRes hypothesis relies on a postulate that less complex systems exhibit faster kinetics than equivalent but more complex systems. Furthermore, system's complexity is affected by its symmetry (more symmetric systems are simpler), and symmetry (in general meaning) of reactants may be affected by their isotopic composition.

The term “resonance” relates to the use of this term in nuclear physics, where peaks in the dependence of a reaction cross section upon energy are called “resonances”. Similarly, a sharp increase (or decrease) in the reaction kinetics as a function of the average isotopic mass of a certain element is called here a resonance.

== History of formulation ==
The concept of isotopes developed from radioactivity. The pioneering work on radioactivity by Henri Becquerel, Marie Curie and Pierre Curie was awarded the Nobel Prize in Physics in 1903. Later Frederick Soddy would take radioactivity from physics to chemistry and shed light on the nature of isotopes, something with rendered him the Nobel Prize in Chemistry in 1921 (awarded in 1922).

The question of stable, non-radioactive isotopes was more difficult and required the development by Francis Aston of a high-resolution mass spectrograph, which allowed the separation of different stable isotopes of one and the same element. Francis Aston was awarded the 1922 Nobel Prize in Chemistry for this achievement. With his enunciation of the whole-number rule, Aston solved a problem that had riddled chemistry for a hundred years. The understanding was that different isotopes of a given element would be chemically identical.

It was discovered in the 1930s by Harold Urey in 1932 (awarded the Nobel Prize in Chemistry in 1934). It was early on found that the deuterium content had a profound effect on chemistry and biochemistry.

In the linear approximation, the effect of isotopic substitution is proportional to the mass ratio of the heavy and light isotope. Thus chemical and biological effects of heavier isotopes of the “biological” atoms C, N and O are expected to be much smaller since the mass ratios for the normal to heavier isotopes are much closer to unity than the factor two for hydrogen to deuterium. However, it has been reported in 1930s, and then again in 1970s and 1990s, as well as recently, that relatively small changes in the content of the heavy isotope of hydrogen, deuterium, has profound effects on biological systems. These strong nonlinear effects could not be fully rationalized based on the known concepts of the isotopic effects. These and other observations make it possible that isotopes have a much more profound importance than could ever have been imagined by the pioneers.

In 2011 Roman Zubarev formulated the isotope resonance hypothesis. It originated in the following, unexpected observation. Define ΔM_{m} = M_{mono} - M_{nom}, where M_{mono} is the monoisotopic mass (e.g. O = 15.994915 Da) and M_{nom} is the nominal (integer) mass, i.e., the number of nucleons (e.g. ^{16}O = 16). ΔM_{m} is a constant in the whole Universe. Define ΔM_{is} = M_{av} - M_{mono}, where M_{av} is the average isotopic mass (e.g. O = 15.999 Da on Earth). Obviously ΔM_{is} depends on the precise isotopic composition for a given molecule. Finally define NMD = 1000ΔM_{m}/M_{nom} and NIS = 1000ΔM_{is}/M_{nom}, where NMD [in units of ‰] and NIS [in units of ‰] are the normalized isotopic defect and shift, respectively. If NIS is plotted as a function of NMD for a large number of terrestrial peptides, one would anticipate a homogenous distribution of data points (as in Fig. 1B). This is not what was found by Zubarev's team, instead they found band gap in the distribution with a narrow line in the middle (Fig. 1A).

This serendipitous discovery led Zubarev to formulate the isotope resonance hypothesis.

== Analogues in science ==
As an example of isotopic symmetry (in compositional, and not in geometrical sense) affecting the kinetics of physic-chemical processes, see mass independent isotope fractionation in ozone O_{3}.

== Implication for the origin of life ==
According to the IsoRes hypothesis, there are certain resonance isotopic compositions at which terrestrial organisms thrive best. Curiously, average terrestrial isotopic compositions are very close to a resonance affecting a large class of amino acids and polypeptides, the molecules of outmost importance for life. Thus, the IsoRes hypothesis suggests that early life on Earth was aided, perhaps critically, by the proximity to an IsoRes. In contrast, there is no strong resonance for then atmosphere of Mars, which led to a prediction that life could not have originated on Mars and that the planet is probably sterile.

== Other nontrivial predictions ==
One would expect that enrichment of heavy isotopes leads to progressively slower reactions, but the IsoRes hypothesis suggests that there exist certain resonance compositions for which kinetics increases even for higher abundances of heavy stable isotopes. For example, at 9.5% ^{13}C, 10.9% ^{15}N and 6.6% ^{18}O (when all three elements are 10-35 times enriched compared to their natural abundances) and normal deuterium composition (150 ppm or 0.015%), a very strong resonance (Fig. 1C) is predicted (“super-resonance”). Yet another nontrivial prediction of the IsoRes hypothesis is that at ≈250-350 ppm deuterium content, the terrestrial resonance becomes “perfect”, and the rates of biochemical reactions and growth of terrestrial organisms further increase. This prediction seems to be matched by at least some experimental observations.

== Experimental verification ==
The IsoRes hypothesis has been tested experimentally by means of growth of E. coli and found to be supported by extremely strong statistics (p << 10^{−15}). Particular strong evidence of faster growth was found for the “super-resonance”.

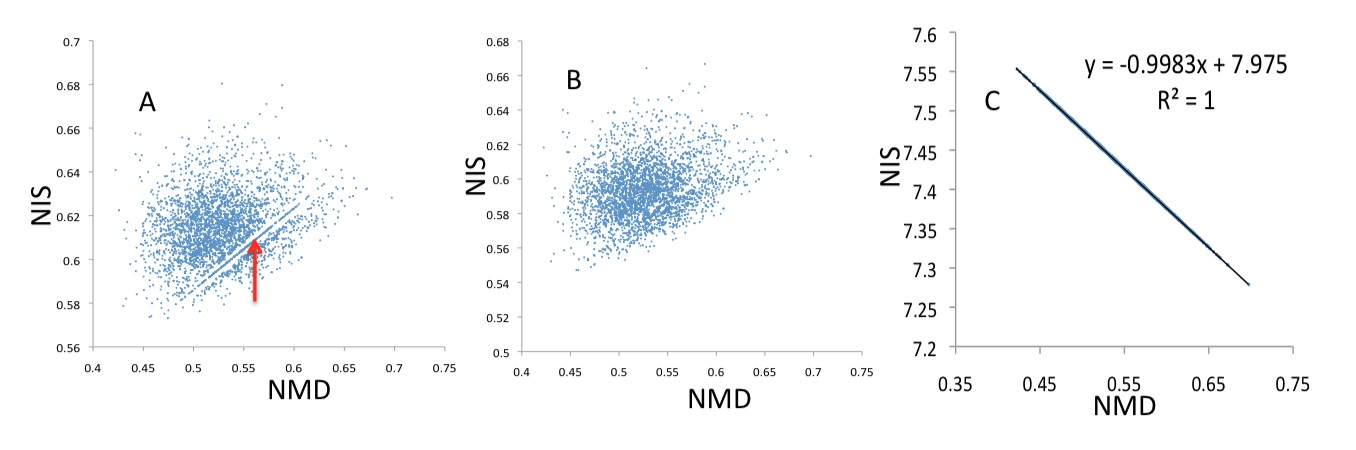
Fig1

Fig. 1. 2D plot of molecular masses of 3000 E. coli tryptic peptides. A – terrestrial isotopic compositions (red arrow shows the line representing the resonance); B – ^{18}O abundance is increased by 20%, which destroyed the terrestrial resonance; C – isotopic compositions of the “super-resonance”, where all dots (molecules) are perfectly aligned. Adapted from ref. 4.

== See also ==
- Stable nuclide
- Mass independent isotope fractionation
- Heavy water
