= William Beavis =

American geneticist

- Born: Ypsilanti, Michigan
- Education: Humboldt State University; New Mexico State University; Iowa State University
- Scientific career
- Fields: Agronomy
- Institutions: Pioneer Hi-Bred; National Center for Genome Resources; Iowa State University
- Thesis: Expression of Nuclear-Cytoplasmic Interactions on Quantitatively Inherited Traits from Interspecific Matings of Oat Species (1986)

William D. Beavis is professor and GF Sprague Chair for Population Genetics in the Department of Agronomy at Iowa State University. His research focuses on statistical genetics and ways to optimize plant breeding. He is known for discovering what has since become known as the Beavis effect: namely, that the estimates of phenotypic variance associated with one of multiple quantitative trait loci, each of which has a small effect on the trait being studied, are typically significantly inflated if the sample size of organisms in the study is too low (e.g. about 100), but that these estimates are fairly accurate if the number of individuals is much greater (about 1,000).

== Education and career ==
Beavis was educated at Humboldt State University, New Mexico State University, and Iowa State University. In 1986, he began working for Pioneer Hi-Bred, where he continued to work until 1998. That year, he began working at the National Center for Genome Resources, where he served as chief science officer from 2000 until his departure in 2007. He joined the faculty of Iowa State University in 2007 and served as interim director of their Plant Sciences Institute from 2009 to 2014.
