= Vanessa Beavis =

New Zealand anaesthesiologist

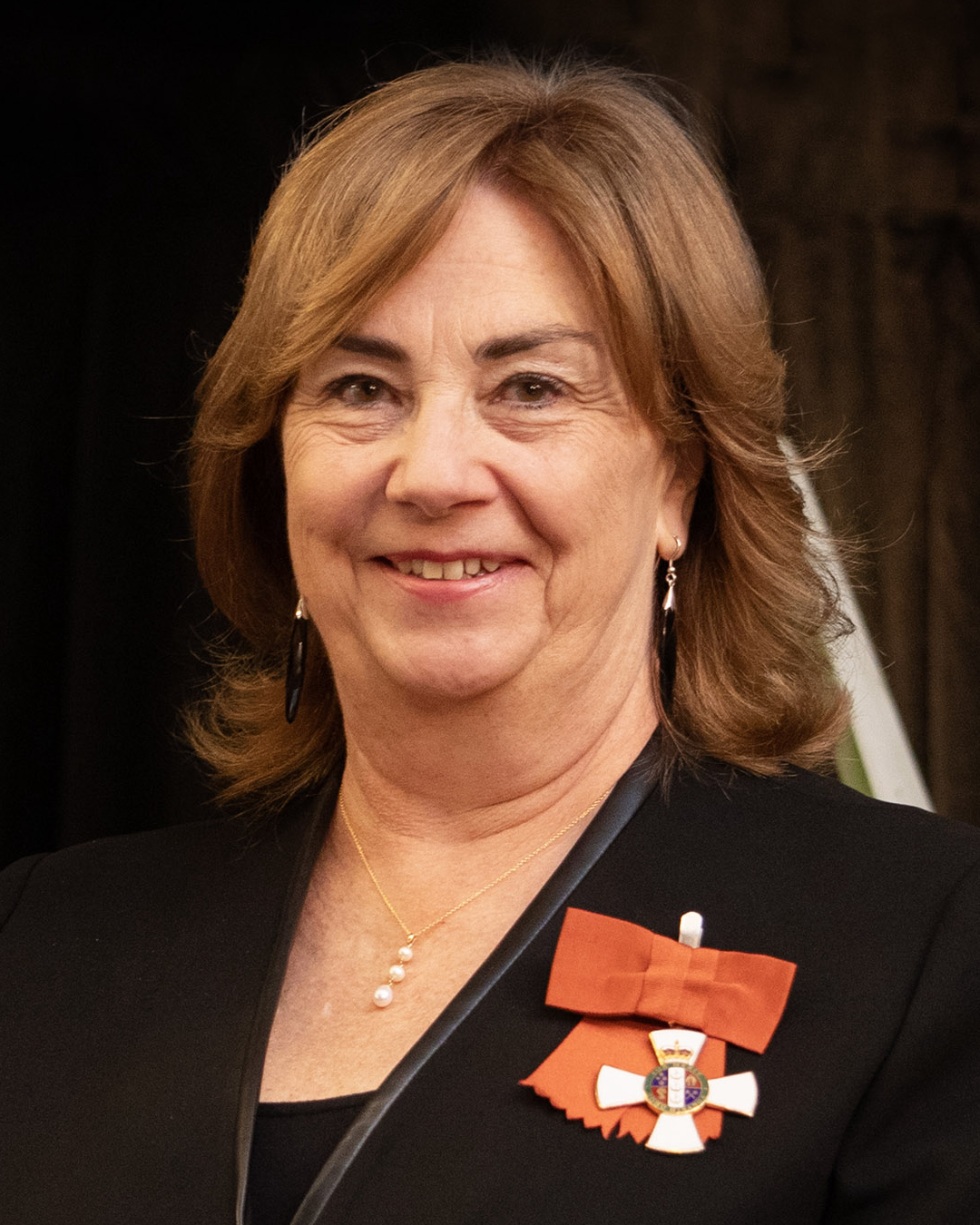
Beavis in 2024

Vanessa Shona Beavis CNZM is a New Zealand anaesthesiologist and honorary senior lecturer of the University of Auckland. From 2020 to 2022, Beavis was president of the Australian and New Zealand College of Anaesthetists (ANZCA).

== Career ==
Beavis was trained in South Africa. Before coming to New Zealand, she worked in the United States. She was previously a house surgeon.

Starting in 1997, Beavis had leadership roles at Auckland City Hospital, where from 2004 until 2020, she was Director of Perioperative Services. She now consults for the hospital. During the beginning of the COVID-19 pandemic, Beavis prepared the hospital for the pandemic. She has also started an anaesthesia service in Auckland to assist people in New Zealand needing a liver transplant. At the University of Auckland, Beavis is an honorary senior lecturer.

Beavis is a fellow of the Australian and New Zealand College of Anaesthetists (ANZCA) as of 2023. She joined its New Zealand National Committee in 2004, chairing from 2008 to 2011. She was also a member of ANZCA's examining body from 2002 to 2014. She became a member of the council in 2012, and was president from 2020 to 2022. In the college's council, she was founding chair of Anaesthetists in Management and Perioperative Medicine, and developed Continuing Professional Development programme and the organisation's Diploma in Perioperative Medicine. She also promoted the cultural inclusion of indigenous Australians through the Treaty of Waitangi.

In 2021 Beavis helped develop and launch the International Academy of Medical Colleges of Anaesthesiologists (IACA), which she is executive committee chair of. That year, she was also appointed to the Health Practitioners Disciplinary Tribunal. In the 2024 New Year Honours, Beavis was appointed a Companion of the New Zealand Order of Merit, for services to anaesthesia.
