= Len Beavis =

New Zealand footballer

Personal information
- Full name: Len A Beavis
- Place of birth: New Zealand

Senior career*
Years	Team	Apps	(Gls)
- Nomads

International career
1947	New Zealand	1	(0)
- * Club domestic league appearances and goals

Len Beavis is a former association football player who represented New Zealand at international level.

Beavis made a single appearance in an official international for New Zealand in a 5–6 loss to South Africa on 28 June 1947.
