= Bevis, Ohio =

Unincorporated community in Ohio, U.S.

Coordinates: 39°15′27″N 84°36′06″W

Bevis is an unincorporated community in Colerain Township, Hamilton County, in the U.S. state of Ohio.

== History ==
An early variant name was Bevis Tavern. A post office called Bevis Tavern was established in 1835, the name was changed to Bevis in 1874, and the post office closed in 1903. Jesse Bevis, an early postmaster and hotel proprietor, gave the community his name.
