= Molecular & Cellular Proteomics =

- Discipline: Proteomics
- Language: English
- Edited by: Alma L. Burlingame

Publication details
- History: 2002–present
- Publisher: American Society for Biochemistry and Molecular Biology (United States)
- Frequency: Monthly
- Open access: Delayed, after 12 months
- Impact factor: 7.381 (2021)

Standard abbreviations
- ISO 4: Mol. Cell. Proteom.
- NLM: Mol Cell Proteomics

Indexing
- ISSN: 1535-9476 (print); 1535-9484 (web)
- LCCN: 2001213374
- OCLC no.: 47250252

Links
- Journal homepage; Online access; Online archive

Molecular & Cellular Proteomics is a monthly peer-reviewed scientific journal established in 2002 and published by the American Society for Biochemistry and Molecular Biology. It covers research on structural and functional properties of proteins, especially with regard to development.

== Scope & history ==
The journal also publishes other content such as "HUPO views", which are reports from the Human Proteome Organization (HUPO), proceedings from HUPO meetings, and the proceedings of the International Symposium On Mass Spectrometry In The Life Sciences.

As of January 2010, the journal is published online only and no longer available in print. The editor-in-chief is A.L. Burlingame. All articles are available free 1 year after publication. In press articles are available free on its website immediately after acceptance.

== Abstracting and indexing ==
The journal is abstracted and indexed, for example, in:

- Medline
- PubMed
- Index Medicus
- Science Citation Index
- Current Contents - Life Sciences
- Scopus
- BIOSIS Previews
- Science Citation Index Expanded
- Chemical Abstracts Service

According to the Journal Citation Reports, the journal has a 2023 impact factor of 6.1.
