= Gpm (proteomics) =

In proteomics, GPM stands for "Global Proteome Machine". It is a web-based, open source user interface for analyzing and displaying protein identification data. It was originally designed by Rob Craig and Ron Beavis and first released in 2003. The interface creates a series of web browser page views of tandem mass spectrometry data that has been assigned to protein sequences. The underlying data documents are stored in BIOML format files.

Since its original creation, GPM has been under continuous development. Major developments include the following:

1. Creation of GPMDB: a large proteomics database generated using GPM;
2. Inclusion in the Human proteome project as a data analysis and information resource;
3. Development of a REST API for GPMDB.
