= 2011–12 Newport County A.F.C. season =

Welsh association football club season

Newport County
2011–12 season
- Chairman: Chris Blight
- Manager: Anthony Hudson (until 28 September); Justin Edinburgh (from 4 October)
- Stadium: Newport Stadium
- Conference National: 19th
- FA Cup: First round
- FA Trophy: Runners-up
- Welsh Cup: Fourth round
- Top goalscorer: League: Danny Rose (11); All: Sam Foley (12)
- Highest home attendance: 2,362 vs Shrewsbury Town (FA Cup, 12 Nov 2011)
- Lowest home attendance: 1,011 vs Fleetwood Town (17 December 2011)
- Average home league attendance: 1,349
Home colours	Away colours

The 2011–12 season was Newport County's second consecutive season in the Conference National. The club finished the season in 19th place and were runners-up in the FA Trophy final at Wembley — their first visit to Wembley in the club's 100-year history.

== Season review ==
=== League ===
==== 2011 ====
Manager Anthony Hudson's stated intention was to get Newport County back into the Football League. The season began in the best possible way at Kettering Town's new Nene Park ground with Elliot Buchanan putting County into a 1–0 lead after only six minutes. However hints of the season-to-come's struggles were evident when Kettering scored twice in the second half to lead 2–1. Danny Rose immediately equalised to leave the score 2–2 until Kettering were awarded a 90th-minute penalty. This was duly converted and County lost 3–2. The first home game against Hayes & Yeading was emphatically won 4–0, but thereafter began a run of 10 games without victory that cost Anthony Hudson his job. After draws against Grimsby Town and Ebbsfleet United County suffered five straight defeats including a televised 5–0 humiliation away at Mansfield Town that pushed County into the relegation zone. In each of the next three games County were on course for victory but succumbed to late goals. At home to Stockport County for the first time since August 1987 Danny Rose had given the home side a 30th-minute lead only for an 81st-minute equaliser for the visitors to deny Newport a win. In the next home game against Barrow County were 2–1 up going into injury time but again fell to a 90th-minute penalty, drawing 2–2. Away to Forest Green Rovers County were winning 1–0 only for former County player Charlie Griffin to equalise and yet another game was drawn. This was to prove to be Hudson's last game in charge. With a miserable return of only five points from their last ten games and County lying in last-but-one place in the table he was sacked the next day. Assistant manager Lee Harrison took charge for the next game away at Darlington who themselves were in a bad run of form, but County's miserable run continued. Two first half goals for the home side helped them to their first win in seven games with County remaining rooted in the relegation zone four points from safety. Justin Edinburgh was announced as the new manager on 4 October with the job of saving County from relegation. The enormity of the task was revealed in his first game in charge at home to Southport with three first-half goals condemning County to yet another defeat. The next game away to promotion hopefuls Fleetwood Town began with the home side taking the lead within 52 seconds. However, a rout was avoided and against all the odds County eventually ran out 4–1 winners with Sam Foley scoring a hat-trick. This most unlikely of victories was only the second of 15 games so far in the season. After a 2–1 defeat at Tamworth revenge was extracted on Kettering Town in a 3–1 home victory with Danny Rose scoring a hat-trick. After a 0–0 draw at Wrexham and a 1–0 defeat at home to Ebbsfleet United County travelled to Blundell Park to face Grimsby Town. After being 2–0 up inside 17 minutes County again fell to late goals, with Serge Makofo scoring in the 79th minute and Anthony Elding converting an 87th-minute penalty. At home against Luton Town County looked on course to get a point from a 0–0 draw but yet again were undone by a late goal with Danny Crow scoring in the 2nd minute of stoppage time. In the next game at Woking's Kingfield Stadium County achieved a second 4–0 victory over Hayes & Yeading which finally lifted them out of the relegation zone on goal difference. This was followed the first visit of Lincoln City since the Third Division match of March 1986. This match was won 1–0 and County leapfrogged City into 18th place in the table. In the next game at home to 23rd-placed Alfreton Town County's record of conceding late goals continued. After leading from an Eliott Buchanan goal in the 4th minute County were 2–1 behind by the 28th minute. A Gary Warren equaliser in the 60th minute looked to have achieved a point for County, but an 89th-minute winner gave Alfreton just their second win in 14 games. With the proposed Boxing Day fixture at home to Bath City a victim of the weather the last game of 2011 was the home fixture against high-flying Fleetwood Town. Fleetwood maintained their charge at the top of the table with a 75th-minute winner but County saw out the end of the year outside the relegation zone.

==== 2012 ====
The new year began with the short away trip to bottom-placed Bath City. County again took an early lead through Nat Jarvis in the 13th minute but lost the game 3–2 to give Bath only their third victory of the season. That loss pushed County back to the brink of the relegation zone, only staying out on goal difference. Away to Luton Town County lost 2–0 after debutant Ryan Charles was sent off after 32 minutes. After a home 0–0 draw with Forest Green Rovers County made the long trip to Gateshead. Finding themselves 2–0 down after 53 minutes Elliot Buchanan pulled a goal back in the 57th minute. As the game drew to a close another County defeat looked likely. However, County were awarded a penalty in the 90th minute. Sam Foley's spot-kick was initially saved but he was quick to tap in the rebound. The comeback was complete in the 94th minute when substitute Jake Harris scored a 20-yard winner. Despite the victory County had now slipped back into the relegation zone. County's next game saw a return to Stockport County's Edgeley Park for the first time since January 1988. Finding themselves 1–0 behind after just seven minutes Andy Sandell equalised in the 50th minute before being sent off just eight minutes later. After Daniel Rowe grabbed his second of the game just minutes later the hosts were back in front with Newport a man down. As the clock ticked towards full-time Jake Harris scored the equaliser in the 87th minute having only been on the pitch for nine minutes. The next game saw a 1–0 revenge victory at home over Bath City. County had now left the relegation zone and leapt four places to 17th in the table. The following game saw another 1–0 revenge victory, this time against high-flying Mansfield Town. That victory took County to 16th in the table – the highest they had been since August. In the next game away at Tamworth County took an early lead through a 6th-minute Sam Foley penalty. As the game entered the final minutes this looked to be the third straight County victory but Tamworth equalised in the 83rd minute. Two minutes later and the hosts had won it, the final score a 2–1 County defeat. After an away 1–1 draw at Southport County were at home to mid-table Braintree Town. After only seven minutes on the clock Lee Minshull was sent off. County eventually lost 4–3 having played 83 minutes of normal time and 12 minutes of stoppage time with only ten men. By this point in the season County knew they had made the FA Trophy Final at Wembley but were still in danger of relegation. Away at Cambridge United County trailed 1–0 until Andy Sandell scored a penalty five minutes from time to earn County a 1–1 draw. Next up was a first trip to Lincoln City's Sincil Bank since the Third Division encounter in October 1985. The game was lost 2–0 and County found themselves just one place and one point above the relegation zone. County achieved their second double of the season in the next game, beating Gateshead 1–0 at home, but were still only one place and one point above relegation. The next game was the first of the three encounters with promotion hopefuls York City. County won 2–1. The third home game in a week resulted in a 0–0 draw against Telford United to take seven points out of the nine available. Away to Kidderminster Harriers Jake Reid scored for County within 10 seconds of kick-off and Sam Foley doubled the lead on 36 minutes. With full-time approaching Elliot Buchanan gave away a penalty in the 86th minute. Substitute Nick Wright duly converted it and full-time was up. However, in a disastrous spell of injury time Wright scored Kidderminster's equaliser in the 93rd minute and then the winner in the 95th minute for his hat-trick. The next game was the second of three games against York City. County again started well with Nat Jarvis scoring in the 4th minute. York equalised in the 59th minute and the game ended a 1–1 draw. County now knew that they only needed a point against relegated Darlington to secure league safety barring some statistically improbable results elsewhere. That point came with a 0–0 draw. Any doubts that County were now safe were extinguished by the following 1–0 victory over Alfreton Town. Manager Justin Edinburgh had achieved his aim of avoiding relegation. The final two league games of the season, results now immaterial, were a home 1–0 loss to second-placed Wrexham and a 3–1 loss to Barrow.

==== Results summary ====
Overall								Home						Away					
Pld	W	D	L	GF	GA	GD	Pts	W	D	L	GF	GA	GD	W	D	L	GF	GA	GD
46	11	14	21	53	65	−12	47	8	6	9	22	22	0	3	8	12	31	43	−12

Last updated: 28 Apr 2012.

==== Results by round ====
Round	1	2	3	4	5	6	7	8	9	10	11	12	13	14	15	16	17	18	19	20	21	22	23	24	25	26	27	28	29	30	31	32	33	34	35	36	37	38	39	40	41	42	43	44	45	46
Ground	A	H	H	A	A	H	H	A	A	H	H	A	A	H	A	H	H	A	H	A	H	A	H	A	H	A	A	H	A	A	H	H	A	A	H	A	A	H	H	H	A	A	H	H	H	A
Result	L	W	D	D	L	L	L	L	L	D	D	D	L	L	W	L	W	D	L	D	L	W	W	L	L	L	L	D	W	D	W	W	L	D	L	D	L	W	W	D	L	D	D	W	L	L
Position	19	10	11	12	16	17	19	21	21	23	23	23	23	23	22	22	22	22	22	22	22	20	18	19	19	20	20	20	21	21	17	16	16	17	17	18	20	20	18	17	19	19	20	17	17	19

Updated to match(es) played on 28 Apr 2012. Source: statto.com
A = Away; H = Home; W = Win; D = Draw; L = Loss

=== Cup ===
==== FA Cup ====
County started this season's FA Cup in the 4th qualifying round at home to fellow Conference Premier team Braintree Town. The teams had previously met in the league when County had suffered their fifth straight defeat. This game provided a total of seven goals: The first came when former County loan player Ben Wright put the visitors ahead in the 9th minute. Sam Foley equalised for County in the 25th minute before Craig McAllister put the hosts ahead in the 54th minute. Andy Yiadom equalised for Braintree, making it 2–2 on 67 minutes before Nat Jarvis put County back ahead in the 76th minute. As the game entered the last five minutes it seemed likely that County would progress into the First Round proper for the first time since 2006, however Braintree equalised yet again with captain Kenny Davis' 20-yard strike in the 86th minute. With a replay looking inevitable Paul Rodgers won it for County in the 89th minute with a 45-yard cross that found its way into the visitor's net.

In the First Round County were drawn at home to Shrewsbury Town — the teams meeting again for the first time since County's Welsh Cup Final triumph in 1980. The televised match only provided the one goal, and it was Shrewsbury who progressed into the Second Round courtesy of a Terry Gornell goal in the 41st minute.

==== FA Trophy ====
County's run in the FA Trophy started unremarkably with a home 0–0 draw with fellow Conference National side Forest Green Rovers. The replay was won 2–0 thanks to Craig McAllister's second goal of the season in the first half and a Darryl Knights strike in the second.

The twice-postponed second-round match away to Worksop Town finally went ahead on 24 January. County took the lead in the 59th minute, but conceded an equaliser in the 71st minute. In the 84th minute another replay looked likely, but substitute Jake Harris put County back in front having only been on the pitch for four minutes. In the final minute of the game Harris grabbed his second goal in his ten-minute spell on the pitch leaving the final score 3–1.

The third-round game against Carshalton Athletic was won 4–0. Sam Foley opened the scoring in the 4th minute, with Elliott Buchanan adding the second in the 35th minute. Adam Chapman scored County's third just a minute after the second-half restart, with debutant Romone Rose getting the fourth in the 86th minute.

In the fourth round away to Northwich Victoria County found themselves 1–0 down after 26 minutes and 2–0 down after 47. Super-substitute Jake Harris was called for on 52 minutes and four minutes later County were back in the game as he scored to leave County trailing by only one goal. With six minutes of time remaining County looked to be out of the Trophy, but Harris struck again levelling the scores at 2–2. A replay would have been a fair result, but County won it in the 89th minute with Nat Jarvis heading the winner.

The opponents for the two-legged semi-final were 1985 FA Trophy winners Wealdstone. In the home leg County took the lead in the 7th minute as a half-clearance from Stones' 'keeper Jonathon North was headed straight at Elliot Buchanan, who chipped the ball back over him into the unguarded net. County's second goal came in the 21st minute: A Gary Warren header from a corner rebounded off the crossbar and Nat Jarvis was quickest to react to head home. Four minutes into the second half and the visitors were back in the game with Richard Jolley making the scoreline 2–1. County restored their two-goal advantage though in the 78th minute when Darryl Knights scored having only been on the pitch for three minutes.

County took their two-goal advantage into the second leg at Wealdstone, knowing that a win, a draw, or even a 1–0 defeat would be enough to get them to the final at Wembley. The final score of 0–0 was indeed enough, and County were headed for their first ever visit to Wembley in 100 years.

== Squad statistics ==
(Substitute appearances in brackets)

No.	Pos.	Name	League		Cup		Total	
No.	Pos.	Name	Apps	Goals	Apps	Goals	Apps	Goals
3	DF	(England) Lee Baker	17 (3)	0	4 (0)	0	21 (3)	0
26	FW	(England) Elliott Buchanan	26 (11)	5	7 (1)	3	33 (12)	8
32	MF	(Northern Ireland) Adam Chapman	4 (1)	0	2 (0)	1	6 (1)	1
20	FW	(England) Ryan Charles	13 (1)	2	0 (0)	0	13 (1)	2
43	GK	(England) Karl Darlow	8 (0)	0	0 (0)	0	8 (0)	0
14	MF	(Northern Ireland) Tommy Doherty	18 (1)	0	2 (1)	0	20 (2)	0
36	MF	(Wales) Lee Evans	3 (0)	0	1 (0)	0	4 (0)	0
10	MF	(Republic of Ireland) Sam Foley	32 (8)	10	9 (0)	2	41 (8)	12
44	DF	(England) Fraser Franks	1 (0)	0	0 (0)	0	1 (0)	0
12	MF	(England) Ryan Gilligan	3 (3)	0	0 (0)	0	3 (3)	0
24	MF	(Wales) Troy Greening	0 (1)	0	0 (0)	0	0 (1)	0
23	FW	(England) Jake Harris	1 (9)	2	0 (7)	4	1 (16)	6
17	DF	(England) Wayne Hatswell	9 (3)	1	3 (1)	0	12 (4)	1
16	DF	(Wales) Andrew Hughes	36 (2)	0	8 (1)	0	44 (3)	0
27	FW	(Netherlands) Felino Jardim	4 (4)	0	0 (0)	0	4 (4)	0
15	FW	(Wales) Nathaniel Jarvis	20 (11)	6	5 (3)	3	25 (14)	9
11	MF	(England) Darryl Knights	12 (11)	1	6 (3)	2	18 (14)	3
21	FW	(England) Robbie Matthews	6 (3)	0	2 (0)	0	8 (3)	0
9	FW	(Scotland) Craig McAllister	19 (6)	0	3 (1)	2	22 (7)	2
30	MF	(England) Lee Minshull	17 (0)	1	4 (0)	0	21 (0)	1
4	DF	(England) Tom Miller	20 (4)	0	3 (0)	0	23 (4)	0
19	MF	(Wales) David Pipe	33 (1)	0	9 (0)	0	42 (1)	0
42	MF	(England) Max Porter	13 (0)	0	3 (0)	0	16 (0)	0
1	GK	(England) Danny Potter	16 (0)	0	4 (0)	0	20 (0)	0
33	FW	(Wales) Luke Prosser	0 (0)	0	0 (1)	0	0 (1)	0
41	FW	(England) Jake Reid	5 (7)	1	0 (1)	0	5 (8)	1
2	DF	(England) Paul Robson	7 (0)	0	0 (0)	0	7 (0)	0
25	DF	(England) Paul Rodgers	30 (7)	0	7 (1)	1	37 (8)	1
8	DF	(England) Scott Rogers	8 (4)	1	0 (1)	0	8 (5)	1
7	MF	(England) Danny Rose	25 (0)	11	5 (0)	0	30 (0)	11
31	FW	(England) Romone Rose	4 (4)	2	2 (3)	1	6 (7)	3
28	MF	(England) Andy Sandell	10 (0)	2	0 (0)	0	10 (0)	2
18	GK	(England) Glyn Thompson	22 (1)	0	6 (0)	0	28 (1)	0
29	MF	(France) Guillaume Velez	3 (1)	0	0 (0)	0	3 (1)	0
5	DF	(England) Gary Warren	35 (0)	3	7 (1)	0	42 (1)	3
6	DF	(England) Ismail Yakubu	26 (0)	5	8 (0)	0	34 (0)	5

=== Transfers ===
==== In ====
Date	Pos.	Name	From	Fee
27 May 2011	ST	(Scotland) Craig McAllister	Crawley Town	Free
29 May 2011	GK	(England) Danny Potter	Torquay United	Free
11 Jun 2011	MF	(Northern Ireland) Tommy Doherty	Bradford City	Free
22 Jun 2011	DF	(Nigeria) Ismail Yakubu	AFC Wimbledon	Free
15 Jul 2011	FW	(England) Elliott Buchanan	Hayes & Yeading United	Free
28 Jul 2011	FW	(Netherlands) Felino Jardim	RBC Roosendaal	Free
28 Jul 2011	DF	(England) Paul Robson	Crystal Palace Baltimore	Free
2 Aug 2011	DF	(England) Paul Rodgers	Northampton Town	Free
10 Aug 2011	MF	(France) Guillaume Velez	Toulouse	Free
6 Jan 2012	DF	(England) Andy Sandell	Chippenham Town	Free
31 Jan 2012	FW	(England) Jake Reid	Salisbury City	Free

==== Out ====
Date	Pos.	Name	To	Fee
20 May 2011	GK	(Wales) Glyn Garner	Bath City	Free
24 May 2011	DF	(Wales) Chris Todd	Forest Green Rovers	Free
2 Jun 2011	MF	(England) Jamie Collins	Aldershot Town	Free
7 Jun 2011	DF	(Tanzania) Eddie Odhiambo	Gateshead	Free
14 Jun 2011	FW	(Scotland) Steven Lennon	Released	Free
22 Jul 2011	DF	(England) Paul Bignot	Blackpool	£100,000 +
14 Oct 2011	DF	(England) Paul Robson	Released	Free
2 Dec 2011	DF	(England) Scott Rogers	Eastleigh	Free
1 Jan 2012	MF	(England) Danny Rose	Fleetwood Town	Undisclosed
10 Jan 2012	FW	(England) Robbie Matthews	Salisbury City	Undisclosed
31 Jan 2012	MF	(England) Tom Miller	Released	Free
31 Jan 2012	MF	(Northern Ireland) Tommy Doherty	Released	Free
8 Mar 2012	GK	(England) Danny Potter	Released	Free

==== Loans in ====
Date	Pos.	Name	From	Expiry
18 Aug 2011	MF	(England) Ryan Gilligan	Northampton Town	January transfer window
9 Sep 2011	FW	(Antigua and Barbuda) Nathaniel Jarvis	Cardiff City	9 Oct 2011
1 Jan 2012	FW	(Antigua and Barbuda) Nathaniel Jarvis	Cardiff City	End of season
6 Jan 2012	FW	(England) Ryan Charles	Cambridge United	End of season
13 Jan 2012	DF	(England) Lee Minshull	AFC Wimbledon	13 Jan 2012
27 Jan 2012	MF	(Northern Ireland) Adam Chapman	Oxford United	End of season
1 Mar 2012	MF	(England) Max Porter	AFC Wimbledon	End of season
8 Mar 2012	GK	(England) Karl Darlow	Nottingham Forest	8 Apr 2012
22 Mar 2012	DF	(England) Fraser Franks	AFC Wimbledon	22 Apr 2012

==== Loans out ====
Date	Pos.	Name	To	Expiry
19 Aug 2011	FW	(England) Robbie Matthews	Forest Green Rovers	19 Sep 2011
23 Sep 2011	FW	(England) Robbie Matthews	Salisbury City	23 Oct 2011
26 Sep 2011	DF	(Nigeria) Ismail Yakubu	Cambridge United	26 Oct 2011
3 Nov 2011	MF	(Wales) Ryan Newman	Merthyr Town	3 Dec 2011
3 Nov 2011	MF	(Wales) Troy Greening	Merthyr Town	3 Dec 2011
18 Jan 2012	FW	(Scotland) Craig McAllister	Luton Town	End of season

== Fixtures and results ==
=== Pre-season friendlies ===
Date	Opponents	Venue	Result	Scorers	Attendance
Wed 6 Jul 2011	Chepstow Town	Larkfield Park	3–1	Achaemdong 2 (1P), Ampleford	c. 260
Wed 13 Jul 2011	Merthyr Town	Penydarren Park	4–1	Rose, Baker, Kelleher 2	491
Sat 16 Jul 2011	Stoke City	Newport Stadium	1–1	Warren	2,120
Wed 20 Jul 2011	Mangotsfield United	Cossham Street	2–1	Jardim, OG	c. 250
Sat 23 Jul 2011	Cheltenham Town	Newport Stadium	1–0	Yakubu	961
Sat 30 Jul 2011	Bolton Wanderers	Newport Stadium	1–3	Buchanan	2,007
Wed 3 Aug 2011	Real Betis	Newport Stadium	0–3		855
Fri 5 Aug 2011	Neath	The Gnoll	5–2	Foley, Buchanan 3, Miller	386
Sun 7 Aug 2011	Undy Athletic	Playing Fields	6–2	Hughes, Hall, Matthews, Rodgers, Greening, Thomas	c. 300

=== Conference National ===
13 August 2011 1	Kettering Town	3–2	Newport County	Irthlingborough
15:00	Marna 51'; Cunnington 60'; Marna 90' (pen.)		Buchanan 6'; Rose 61'	Stadium: Nene Park; Attendance: 2,047; Referee: Andrew Davies

16 August 2011 2	Newport County	4–0	Hayes & Yeading United	Newport
19:45	Rogers 14'; Buchanan 53'; Rose 62'; Rose 66'			Stadium: Newport Stadium; Attendance: 1,519; Referee: Justin Amey

20 August 2011 3	Newport County	0–0	Grimsby Town	Newport
15:00				Stadium: Newport Stadium; Attendance: 1,675; Referee: Rob Merchant

23 August 2011 4	Ebbsfleet United	1–1	Newport County	Northfleet
19:45	West 90+4'		Buchanan 4'	Stadium: Stonebridge Road; Attendance: 992; Referee: Graham Norwood

27 August 2011 5	Telford United	2–1	Newport County	Telford
15:00	Preston 17'; Newton 57' (pen.)		Rose 41'	Stadium: New Bucks Head; Attendance: 2,147; Referee: Peter Bankes

29 August 2011 6	Newport County	1–3	Kidderminster Harriers	Newport
15:00	Foley 50'		Byrne 49'; Miller 65' (o.g.); Jones 80'	Stadium: Newport Stadium; Attendance: 1,672; Referee: Kevin Johnson

3 September 2011 7	Newport County	0–1	Cambridge United	Newport
15:00			Charles 15'	Stadium: Newport Stadium; Attendance: 1,515; Referee: Stephen Martin

10 September 2011 8	Mansfield Town	5–0	Newport County	Mansfield
17:15	Green 12'; Briscoe 34'; Dyer 56'; Briscoe 72'; O'Neil 75'			Stadium: Field Mill; Attendance: 2,324; Referee: Jeremy Simpson

17 September 2011 9	Braintree Town	1–0	Newport County	Braintree
15:00	Wright 20'			Stadium: Cressing Road; Attendance: 786; Referee: Amy Fearn

20 September 2011 10	Newport County	1–1	Stockport County	Newport
19:45	Rose 31'		Elliot 82'	Stadium: Newport Stadium; Attendance: 1,205; Referee: Graham Horwood

24 September 2011 11	Newport County	2–2	Barrow	Newport
15:00	Jarvis 9'; Rose 73'		Boyes 5'; Baker 90+1' (pen.)	Stadium: Newport Stadium; Attendance: 1,315; Referee: Aluin-Wyn Davies

27 September 2011 12	Forest Green Rovers	1–1	Newport County	Nailsworth
19:45	Griffin 66'		Jarvis 38'	Stadium: The New Lawn; Attendance: 1,203; Referee: Rob Merchant

1 October 2011 13	Darlington	2–0	Newport County	Darlington
15:00	Bridge Wilkinson 31' (pen.); Purcell 45'			Stadium: Darlington Arena; Attendance: 1,785; Referee: Peter Bankes

8 October 2011 14	Newport County	0–3	Southport	Newport
15:00			Grand 30'; Ledsham 40'; Gray 44'	Stadium: Newport Stadium; Attendance: 1,576; Referee: Justin Amey

11 October 2011 15	Fleetwood Town	1–4	Newport County	Fleetwood
19:45	Sheddon 1'		Foley 15'; Rose 23' (pen.); Foley 29'; Foley 59'	Stadium: Highbury Stadium; Attendance: 1,277; Referee: Richard Wigglesworth

15 October 2011 16	Newport County	1–2	Tamworth	Newport
15:00	Knights 74'		St. Aimie 47'; Christie 59'	Stadium: Newport Stadium; Attendance: 1,310; Referee: John Hopkins

18 October 2011 17	Newport County	3–1	Kettering Town	Newport
19:45	Rose 34' (pen.); Rose 53'; Rose 62'		Ashikodi 45'	Stadium: Newport Stadium; Attendance: 1,249; Referee: Stephen Martin

22 October 2011 18	Wrexham	0–0	Newport County	Wrexham
15:00				Stadium: Racecourse Ground; Attendance: 4,232; Referee: Tony Harrington

5 November 2011 19	Newport County	0–1	Ebbsfleet United	Newport
15:00			Shakes 20'	Stadium: Newport Stadium; Attendance: 1,412; Referee: Declan Ford

19 November 2011 20	Grimsby Town	2–2	Newport County	Cleethorpes
15:00	Makofo 79'; Elding 87' (pen.)		Hatswell 2'; Jarvis 17'	Stadium: Blundell Park; Attendance: 2,701; Referee: Richard Clark

26 November 2011 21	Newport County	0–1	Luton Town	Newport
15:00			Crow 90'	Stadium: Newport Stadium; Attendance: 1,511; Referee: Tim Robinson

29 November 2011 22	Hayes & Yeading United	0–4	Newport County	Woking
19:45			Rose 22'; Foley 38'; Yakubu 45'; Yakubu 75'	Stadium: Kingfield Stadium; Attendance: 303; Referee: Mike Bullen

3 December 2011 23	Newport County	1–0	Lincoln City	Newport
15:00	Yakubu 24'			Stadium: Newport Stadium; Attendance: 1,270; Referee: Karl Evans

6 December 2011 24	Alfreton Town	3–2	Newport County	Alfreton
19:45	Church 29'; Moult 38'; Jarman 89'		Buchanan 4'; Warren 60'	Stadium: North Street (stadium); Attendance: 579; Referee: Darren Bond

17 December 2011 25	Newport County	0–1	Fleetwood Town	Newport
15:00			Cavanagh 75'	Stadium: Newport Stadium; Attendance: 1,011; Referee: John Hopkins

3 January 2012 26	Bath City	3–2	Newport County	Bath
19:45	Connolly 23'; Canham 30'; Murray 47'		Jarvis 13'; Warren 54'	Stadium: Twerton Park; Attendance: 1,147; Referee: Tim Robinson

7 January 2012 27	Luton Town	2–0	Newport County	Luton
15:00	O'Connor 35'; Crow 66'			Stadium: Kenilworth Road; Attendance: 6,108; Referee: Karl Evans

21 January 2012 28	Newport County	0–0	Forest Green Rovers	Newport
15:00				Stadium: Newport Stadium; Attendance: 1,325; Referee: Andrew Davies

28 January 2012 29	Gateshead	2–3	Newport County	Gateshead
15:00	Hatch 45+2'; Shaw 53'		Buchanan 57'; Foley 90' (pen.); Harris 90+4'	Stadium: Gateshead International Stadium; Attendance: 704; Referee: Peter Bankes

11 February 2012 30	Stockport County	2–2	Newport County	Stockport
15:00	Rowe 8'; Rowe 60'		Sandell 50'; Harris 87'	Stadium: Edgeley Park; Attendance: 3,565; Referee: Darren Bond

14 February 2012 31	Newport County	1–0	Bath City	Newport
19:45	Minshull 11'			Stadium: Newport Stadium; Attendance: 1,103; Referee: Bratt

18 February 2012 32	Newport County	1–0	Mansfield Town	Newport
15:00	Foley 33'			Stadium: Newport Stadium; Attendance: 1,285; Referee: Tim Robinson

21 February 2012 33	Tamworth	2–1	Newport County	Tamworth
19:45	Barrow 83'; Thomas 85'		Foley 6' (pen.)	Stadium: The Lamb Ground; Attendance: 815; Referee: Handley

3 March 2012 34	Southport	1–1	Newport County	Southport
15:00	Warren 18' (o.g.)		Yakubu 40'	Stadium: Haig Avenue; Attendance: 1,105; Referee: Stephen Martin

6 March 2012 35	Newport County	3–4	Braintree Town	Newport
19:45	Foley 29'; Warren 44'; Charles 90'		Assombalonga 22' 49'; Marks 32'; Wright 35'	Stadium: Newport Stadium; Attendance: 1,101; Referee: Rob Merchant

20 March 2012 36	Cambridge United	1–1	Newport County	Cambridge
19:45	Dawkin 24'		Sandell 86' (pen.)	Stadium: Abbey Stadium; Attendance: 1,815; Referee: Rees

24 March 2012 37	Lincoln City	2–0	Newport County	Lincoln
15:00	McCammon 24'; Nutter 42'			Stadium: Sincil Bank; Attendance: 1,951; Referee: Ross Joyce

31 March 2012 38	Newport County	1–0	Gateshead	Newport
19:45	Charles 11'			Stadium: Newport Stadium; Attendance: 1,261; Referee: Justin Amey

3 April 2012 39	Newport County	2–1	York City	Newport
19:45	Jarvis 32'; Rose 69'		McLaughlin 39'	Stadium: Newport Stadium; Attendance: 1,241; Referee: R. Whitton

6 April 2012 40	Newport County	0–0	Telford United	Newport
19:45				Stadium: Newport Stadium; Attendance: 1,540; Referee: A. Davies

9 April 2012 41	Kidderminster Harriers	3–2	Newport County	Kidderminster
15:00	Wright 86' (pen.) 90+4' 90+6'		Reid 1'; Foley 37'	Stadium: Aggborough Stadium; Attendance: 2,275; Referee: S. Martin

14 April 2012 42	York City	1–1	Newport County	York
15:00	Walker 59'		Jarvis 4'	Stadium: Bootham Crescent; Attendance: 2,824; Referee: R. Clark

17 April 2012 43	Newport County	0–0	Darlington	Newport
19:45				Stadium: Newport Stadium; Attendance: 1,249; Referee: Tim Robinson

21 April 2012 44	Newport County	1–0	Alfreton Town	Newport
15:00	Rose 38'			Stadium: Newport Stadium; Attendance: 1,239; Referee: Barratt

24 April 2012 45	Newport County	0–1	Wrexham	Newport
19:45			Cieslewicz 10'	Stadium: Newport Stadium; Attendance: 1,431; Referee: Bratt

28 April 2012 46	Barrow	3–1	Newport County	Barrow-in-Furness
13:00	Cook 6'; Baker 50'; Boyes 68'		Yakubu 14'	Stadium: Holker Street; Attendance: 900; Referee: Evans

=== FA Cup ===
29 October 2011 4Q	Newport County	4–3	Braintree Town	Newport
15:00	Foley 25'; McAllister 55'; Jarvis 75'; Rodgers 89'		Wright 9'; Yiadom 66'; Davis 86'	Stadium: Newport Stadium; Attendance: 1,234; Referee: Peter Bankes

12 November 2011 1	Newport County	0–1	Shrewsbury Town	Newport
12:30	Rose (yellow card) 75'; Hatswell (yellow card) 81'		Gornell 41'	Stadium: Newport Stadium; Attendance: 2,362; Referee: Darren Drysdale

=== FA Trophy ===
10 December 2011 1	Newport County	0–0	Forest Green Rovers	Newport
15:00				Stadium: Newport Stadium; Attendance: 724; Referee: Amy Fearn

13 December 2011 1r	Forest Green Rovers	0–2	Newport County	Nailsworth
19:45			McAllister 33'; Knights 68'	Stadium: The New Lawn; Attendance: 368; Referee: Rob Merchant

24 January 2012 2	Worksop Town	1–3	Newport County	Worksop
19:45	McDonald 70'		Buchanan 58'; Harris 87'; Harris 90'	Stadium: Sandy Lane; Attendance: 538; Referee: J. Simpson

7 February 2012 3	Newport County	4–0	Carshalton Athletic	Newport
19:45	Foley 4'; Buchanan 36'; Chapman 47'; Rose 88'			Stadium: Newport Stadium; Attendance: 975; Referee: R. Whitton

25 February 2012 QF	Northwich Victoria	2–3	Newport County	Macclesfield
15:00	Kearney 36'; Wade 47'		Harris 59'; Harris 84'; Jarvis 89'	Stadium: Moss Rose; Attendance: 601; Referee: J. Simpson

10 March 2012 SF-1	Newport County	3–1	Wealdstone	Newport
15:00	Buchanan 6'; Jarvis 24'; Knights 79'		Jolly 49'	Stadium: Newport Stadium; Attendance: 2,209; Referee: Oliver Langford

17 March 2012 SF-2	Wealdstone	0–0 (1–3 agg.)	Newport County	Ruislip
15:00				Stadium: Grosvenor Vale; Attendance: 2,092; Referee: James Linington

Final

12 May 2012
15:00 GMT

Newport County	0–2	York City
	Report	Blair 65'; Oyebanjo 72'

Wembley Stadium, London
Attendance: 19,844
Referee: Anthony Taylor

Newport County	York City

GK	18	(England) Glyn Thompson
RB	19	(Wales) David Pipe
CB	5	(England) Gary Warren (c)
CB	6	(England) Ismail Yakubu
LB	16	(Wales) Andrew Hughes
RM	42	(England) Max Porter	(yellow card) 42'	(substituted off) 80'
CM	10	(Republic of Ireland) Sam Foley
LM	36	(Wales) Lee Evans
FW	15	(Wales) Nathaniel Jarvis		(substituted off) 69'
FW	30	(England) Lee Minshull
FW	31	(England) Romone Rose	(yellow card) 66'	(substituted off) 69'
Substitutes:
GK	39	(Wales) Matthew Swann
DF	25	(England) Paul Rodgers
MF	11	(England) Darryl Knights		(substituted on) 80'
FW	23	(England) Jake Harris		(substituted on) 69'
FW	26	(England) Elliott Buchanan		(substituted on) 69'
Manager:
(England) Justin Edinburgh

GK	24	(Northern Ireland) Michael Ingham
RB	20	(England) Jon Challinor
CB	4	(England) Chris Smith (c)	(yellow card) 21'
CB	6	(Wales) Daniel Parslow
LB	27	(England) Ben Gibson
CM	2	(Republic of Ireland) Lanre Oyebanjo
CM	3	(Australia) James Meredith
CM	26	(Northern Ireland) Paddy McLaughlin		(substituted off) 83'
FW	17	(England) Matty Blair
FW	9	(England) Jason Walker		(substituted off) 90'
FW	10	(England) Ashley Chambers		(substituted off) 90'
Substitutes:
GK	1	(England) Paul Musselwhite
DF	16	(England) Jamal Fyfield		(substituted on) 83'
MF	14	(England) Michael Potts
MF	18	(Portugal) Adriano Moke		(substituted on) 90'
FW	7	(Wales) Jamie Reed		(substituted on) 90'
Manager:
(England) Gary Mills

=== Welsh Cup ===
30 November 2011 3	Newport County	3–2	Barry Town	Newport
19:45	Buchanan 40'; Jardim 71'; Rogers 86'		Nagi 26'; Jones 75' (pen.)	Stadium: Newport Stadium; Attendance: 353; Referee: H. Jones

28 January 2012 4	The New Saints	4–0	Newport County	Oswestry
14:30	Rawlinson 15'; Darlington 19'; Draper 26'; Jones 43'			Stadium: Park Hall; Attendance: 278

== League table ==
Pos	Team	Pld	W	D	L	F	A	GD	Pts	Notes
1	Fleetwood Town	46	31	10	5	102	48	+54	103	Champions, promoted
2	Wrexham	46	30	8	8	85	33	+52	98	Play-offs
3	Mansfield Town	46	25	14	7	87	48	+39	89	Play-offs
4	York City	46	23	14	9	81	45	+36	83	Play-off winners, promoted
5	Luton Town	46	22	15	9	78	42	+36	81	Play-offs
6	Kidderminster Harriers	46	22	10	14	82	63	+19	76	
7	Southport	46	21	13	12	72	69	+3	76	
8	Gateshead	46	21	11	14	69	62	+7	74	
9	Cambridge United	46	19	14	13	57	41	+16	71	
10	Forest Green Rovers	46	19	13	14	66	45	+21	70	
11	Grimsby Town	46	19	13	14	79	60	+19	70	
12	Braintree Town	46	17	11	18	76	80	−4	62	
13	Barrow	46	17	9	20	62	76	−14	60	
14	Ebbsfleet United	46	14	12	20	69	84	−15	54	
15	Alfreton Town	46	15	9	22	62	86	−24	54	
16	Stockport County	46	12	15	19	58	74	−16	51	
17	Lincoln City	46	13	10	23	56	66	−10	49	
18	Tamworth	46	11	15	20	47	70	−23	48	
19	Newport County	46	11	14	21	53	65	−12	47	
20	Telford United	46	10	16	20	45	65	−20	46	
21	Hayes & Yeading United	46	11	8	27	58	90	−32	41	Relegated
22	Darlington	46	11	13	22	47	73	−26	36	Ten points deducted, relegated
23	Bath City	46	7	10	29	43	89	−46	31	Relegated
24	Kettering Town	46	8	9	29	40	100	−60	30	Three points deducted, relegated

Key	
	Division Champions
	Promoted
	Into play-offs
	Relegated
