= Sam Foley =

English footballer (born 1986)

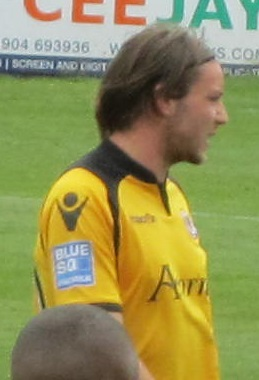
- Foley playing for Newport County in 2012.

Personal information
- Full name: Samuel Robert Foley
- Date of birth: 17 October 1986 (age 40)
- Place of birth: St Albans, England
- Height: 6 ft 0 in (1.83 m)
- Position: Midfielder

Team information
- Current team: Chester

Senior career*
Years	Team	Apps	(Gls)
2006–2008	Cheltenham Town	0	(0)
2008	→ Bath City (loan)	6	(2)
2008–2009	Kidderminster Harriers	0	(0)
2008	→ Redditch United (loan)	7	(2)
2009	→ Newport County (loan)	14	(4)
2009–2012	Newport County	118	(32)
2012–2015	Yeovil Town	88	(7)
2014	→ Shrewsbury Town (loan)	9	(0)
2015–2017	Port Vale	77	(7)
2017–2019	Northampton Town	60	(4)
2019–2021	St Mirren	38	(1)
2021	Motherwell	4	(1)
2021–2022	Tranmere Rovers	39	(1)
2022–2026	Barrow	123	(7)
2026–	Chester	11	(1)

International career
- Republic of Ireland U18

Managerial career
- 2026: Barrow (interim)
- * Club domestic league appearances and goals as of 10:00 18 November 2026 (UTC)

Samuel Robert Foley (born 17 October 1986) is a professional footballer who plays as a midfielder for National League North club Chester. Born in England, he represented the Republic of Ireland at youth level.

A former Republic of Ireland youth international, he began his career at Cheltenham Town. Though he played on loan at Bath City, he left Cheltenham in 2008 without making a first-team appearance. He then spent a year with Kidderminster Harriers, who in turn loaned him on to Redditch United and Newport County. He joined Newport in June 2009 and helped them to win the Conference South title in 2009–10 and to the 2012 FA Trophy final. He returned to the English Football League with Yeovil Town in July 2012. He played in the club's 2013 League One play-off final victory that took them into the Championship. He lost his first-team place in the 2013–14 season and joined Shrewsbury Town on loan before winning Yeovil's Player of the Year award in the 2014–15 season as the club dropped into League Two. He joined Port Vale in June 2015 and left after two seasons to join Northampton Town in May 2017, where he would remain for another two seasons. He joined Scottish club St Mirren in August 2019 and was named the club's Player of the Year for the 2019–20 season. He spent the second half of the 2020–21 season at Motherwell, before returning to England with Tranmere Rovers in July 2021. He joined Barrow in July 2022, where he was named interim manager in March 2026. He resumed his playing career at Chester four months later.

== Career ==
=== Early career ===
Foley signed a two-year professional contract with Cheltenham Town in 2006. However, he spent much of time at Whaddon Road out injured with osteitis pubis and never made a first-team appearance for the "Robins". He spent part of the 2007–08 season on loan at Conference South Bath City. He scored two goals in seven appearances for the "Romans".

In August 2008, he signed a one-year contract with Kidderminster Harriers after impressing manager Mark Yates during a trial spell. He was sent out on loan to Conference North side Redditch United in October 2008. He scored two goals in seven games and "Reds" manager Gary Whild wanted an extended loan spell, but Foley was recalled to Kidderminster in December. He went on to spend the second half of the 2008–09 season on loan at Conference South club Newport County, scoring four goals in 14 appearances. He left Aggborough without making a first-team appearance for the Harriers after rejecting a new contract offer.

=== Newport County ===
In June 2009, Foley was signed by Newport County manager Dean Holdsworth. Foley was immediately a regular in the team, filling all midfield and forward roles at various times, but mostly played as a supporting striker alongside Craig Reid. In the 2009–10 season, County were crowned Conference South champions with a record of 103 points, 28 points ahead of second-place Dover Athletic. He remained a key player in the 2010–11 season, scoring five goals in 44 games as Newport posted a ninth-place finish in the Conference Premier. Three of his goals came on 11 October, in a 4–1 win over Fleetwood Town at Highbury Stadium, in what was new manager Justin Edinburgh's first win at the club. On 12 May, Foley played at Wembley Stadium in the 2012 FA Trophy final, which Newport lost 2–0 to York City. He scored 12 goals in 49 appearances during the 2011–12 season and rejected the offer of a new contract at the end of the season.

=== Yeovil Town ===
Foley signed a one-year contract with League One club Yeovil Town in July 2012. On 14 August, Foley made his Yeovil debut in the League Cup in a 3–0 victory over Colchester United, and scored his first competitive goal for the side on 4 September in a 3–0 Football League Trophy win at Bristol Rovers. On 19 May, Foley played in the 2013 League One play-off final as Yeovil beat Brentford 2–1 to secure promotion to the Championship. In total he scored seven goals in 51 appearances in the 2012–13 campaign, mostly from left-wing. He signed a new two-year contract in June 2013.

He played just nine times in the 2013–14 season as the "Glovers" were relegated out of the Championship. On 7 March 2014, Foley joined League One side Shrewsbury Town on an initial one-month loan. After making nine appearances for the "Shrews", Foley was recalled to Huish Park on 16 April. With Yeovil back in League One Foley was restored to the first-team for the 2014–15 campaign and featured 45 times, mainly in central midfield, as the club suffered a second successive relegation. Though the season was a poor one for the club, Foley managed to find success on an individual level, winning the Western Gazette's Player of the Year award. He rejected the offer of a new contract in the summer in favour of a move to remain in League One.

=== Port Vale ===
In June 2015, Foley signed a two-year contract with League One club Port Vale. He said he aimed to secure a regular first-team place in central midfield. He went on to score six goals in 50 appearances throughout the 2015–16 season, and was also the club's penalty-taker, converting two of four penalty kicks. Manager Rob Page played him both in central midfield and on the left side of midfield throughout the campaign, and told the media that Foley was "outstanding" in both roles.

He remained a key player under new manager Bruno Ribeiro. He missed just two of the opening 15 league games of the 2016–17 season, being named on the EFL Team of the Week after providing two assists in a 3–1 win over Scunthorpe United at Vale Park on 27 August. However, he was forced to undergo surgery on a long-standing ankle injury in October. He returned to training after a three-month recovery spell. In February 2017, he was praised by caretaker manager Michael Brown for playing despite being below full fitness during a difficult period for the club. He scored his first goal of the season in a crucial 2–1 home win against relegation rivals Shrewsbury Town on 17 March.

=== Northampton Town ===
In May 2017, Foley rejected the offer of a new contract at Port Vale to remain in League One on a two-year contract with Northampton Town; the move reunited him with former Newport manager Justin Edinburgh. Port Vale manager Michael Brown said that Port Vale had offered a better wage than Northampton, but Foley had wanted to play at as high a level as possible. He lost his first-team place under new manager Jimmy Floyd Hasselbaink and scored three goals in 28 appearances for the "Cobblers" as the club were relegated at the end of the 2017–18 season. He scored two goals in 40 appearances in the 2018–19 campaign, maintaining his first-team place under first Dean Austin and then Keith Curle, before he was released on 6 May.

=== St Mirren ===
On 1 August 2019, Foley signed a two-year deal with Scottish Premiership side St Mirren. He stepped in as the "Saints" team captain during the absence of Stephen McGinn and Kyle Magennis in January. He went on to win the vote for the PDE St Mirren Player of the Year award for the 2019–20 season; he said that "I've won a few awards throughout my career though and I see them as a reward for hard work on and off the pitch. When you get to my age it's about a love of the job and football is my trade. You need to have a willingness and desire to work hard." He played 15 games in the first half of the 2020–21 season before being benched.

=== Motherwell ===
On 29 January 2021, Foley signed for Motherwell on a contract until the end of the 2020–21 season. A back injury meant that he featured just five times for the "Steelmen", feeling that due to the team's form that he "wasn't in a position to knock on the manager's (Graham Alexander) door". After spending a long time on the sidelines he admitted to thinking "god I hope I remember how to play this game!" He was released by Motherwell at the end of the season.

=== Tranmere Rovers ===
Foley signed a one-year contract with League Two club Tranmere Rovers on 22 July 2021, with manager Micky Mellon citing his "experience, leg power and he is a great athlete". In October, he was described as "an instrumental figure for Rovers" as the team put together a run of form to reach the top six. He ended the 2021–22 season with four goals in 45 appearances, though Tranmere missed out on the play-offs on the final day.

=== Barrow ===
Foley signed a one-year contract with fellow League Two club Barrow on 21 June 2022, with the player joining the club on the expiration of his Tranmere contract in July. He featured 44 times throughout the 2022–23 campaign. Speaking in October 2023, manager Pete Wild said that Foley "had a real impact for us [as a substitute] and he has given us a real sort of drive". He made 48 appearances across the 2023–24 campaign, scoring four goals, but was released in the summer. However, on 27 June, the club announced that Foley had agreed a new one-year deal.

Foley made his 100th Barrow appearance on 28 September 2024, in a 2–0 defeat at Gillingham. He made 39 appearances in the 2024–25 season, scoring four goals. He won four club awards and signed a new one-year deal as the season drew to a close. He sustained a torn tendon in his thigh in August 2025 and underwent an operation to fix it. He returned to action in March 2026, saying "hopefully I can contribute on and off the pitch now". During his time injured, the cub had rotated managers from Andy Whing to Neil McDonald to Paul Gallagher and then to Dino Maamria. Foley was released after the club's relegation out of the Football League.

=== Chester ===
On 10 July 2026, Foley signed a one-year deal with National League North club Chester. He scored his first goal for Chester on 27 October 2026 in a 2–1 victory over Marine.

== Managerial career ==
On 11 March 2026, Foley was appointed as Barrow's interim manager until the end of the 2025–26 season following the sacking of Maamria, with the Bluebirds sitting outside the relegation zone on goal difference only with 11 matches remaining. Foley became the fifth man to take charge of Barrow in a 'revolving door' season. On 2 May, following a 1–2 defeat to Newport County, Barrow were relegated from League Two. He defended his players efforts and said that the squad had been overwhelmed by a sense of negativity.

== Career statistics ==
=== Playing statistics ===
As of match played 21 March 2026

Appearances and goals by club, season and competition
Club	Season	League			National cup (Note: Includes FA Cup, Scottish Cup)		League cup (Note: Includes EFL Cup, Scottish League Cup)		Other		Total	
Club	Season	Division	Apps	Goals	Apps	Goals	Apps	Goals	Apps	Goals	Apps	Goals
Cheltenham Town	2006–07	League One	0	0	0	0	0	0	0	0	0	0
Cheltenham Town	2007–08	League One	0	0	0	0	0	0	0	0	0	0
Cheltenham Town	Total		0	0	0	0	0	0	0	0	0	0
Bath City (loan)	2007–08	Conference South	6	2	0	0	—		1 (Note: Appearance in Somerset Premier Cup)	0	7	2
Kidderminster Harriers	2008–09	Conference Premier	0	0	0	0	—		0	0	0	0
Redditch United (loan)	2008–09	Conference North	7	2	0	0	—		0	0	7	2
Newport County (loan)	2008–09	Conference South	14	4	0	0	—		0	0	14	4
Newport County	2009–10	Conference South	38	17	2	0	—		4 (Note: Appearances in FA Trophy)	0	44	17
Newport County	2010–11	Conference Premier	40	5	1	0	—		3	0	44	5
Newport County	2011–12	Conference Premier	40	10	2	1	—		7	1	49	12
Newport County	Total		132	36	5	1	—		14	1	151	38
Yeovil Town	2012–13	League One	41	5	1	0	2	0	7 (Note: Four appearances and two goals in Football League Trophy, three appearances in League One play-offs)	2	51	7
Yeovil Town	2013–14	Championship	7	0	2	0	0	0	—		9	0
Yeovil Town	2014–15	League One	40	2	4	0	0	0	1 (Note: Appearance in Football League Trophy)	0	45	2
Yeovil Town	Total		88	7	7	0	2	0	8	2	105	9
Shrewsbury Town (loan)	2013–14	League One	9	0	—		—		—		9	0
Port Vale	2015–16	League One	45	6	3	0	2	0	0	0	50	6
Port Vale	2016–17	League One	32	1	0	0	1	0	0	0	33	1
Port Vale	Total		77	7	3	0	3	0	0	0	83	7
Northampton Town	2017–18	League One	24	2	1	0	0	0	3 (Note: Appearance(s) in EFL Trophy)	1	28	3
Northampton Town	2018–19	League Two	36	2	0	0	1	0	3	0	40	2
Northampton Town	Total		60	4	1	0	1	0	6	1	68	5
St Mirren	2019–20	Scottish Premiership	27	1	4	1	0	0	—		31	2
St Mirren	2020–21	Scottish Premiership	11	0	0	0	4	0	—		15	0
St Mirren	Total		38	1	4	1	4	0	0	0	46	2
Motherwell	2020–21	Scottish Premiership	4	1	1	0	—		—		5	1
Tranmere Rovers	2021–22	League Two	39	1	2	0	1	1	3	2	45	4
Barrow	2022–23	League Two	39	0	1	0	1	0	3	1	44	1
Barrow	2023–24	League Two	43	4	2	0	1	0	2	0	48	4
Barrow	2024–25	League Two	34	3	1	0	2	0	2	1	39	4
Barrow	2025–26	League Two	7	0	0	0	0	0	0	0	7	0
Barrow	Total		123	7	4	0	4	0	7	2	138	9
Chester	2026–27	National League North	0	0	0	0	—		0	0	0	0
Career total			583	68	27	2	15	1	39	8	664	79

=== Managerial statistics ===
As of match played 2 May 2026

Managerial record by team and tenure
Team	From	To	Record					Ref.
Team	From	To	P	W	D	L	Win %	Ref.
Barrow (interim)	11 March 2026	2 May 2026	11	2	2	7	18.2	
Total			11	2	2	7	18.2	

== Honours ==
Newport County

- Conference South: 2009–10
- FA Trophy runner-up: 2011–12

Yeovil Town

- Football League One play-offs: 2013

Individual

- Yeovil Town Player of the Year (Western Gazette): 2014–15
- St Mirren Player of the Year: 2019–20
