= 2012 FA Trophy final =

2012 FA Trophy Final
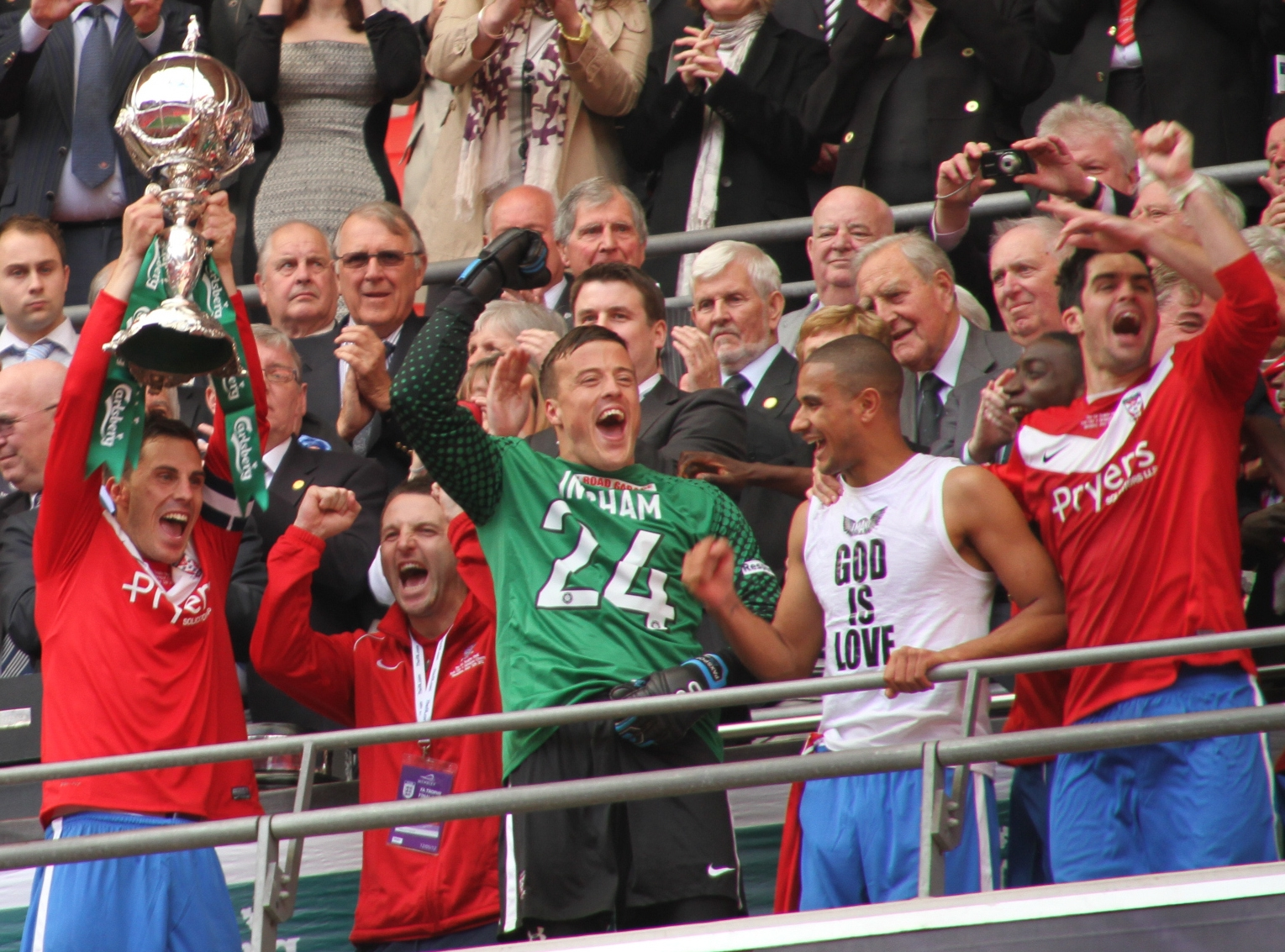
- Event: 2011–12 FA Trophy
| Newport County | York City |
| 0 | 2 |
- Date: 12 May 2012
- Venue: Wembley Stadium, London
- Referee: Anthony Taylor
- Attendance: 19,844

The 2012 FA Trophy Final was the 43rd final of the Football Association's cup competition for levels 5–8 of the English football league system. The match was contested by Newport County and York City. York City were beaten finalists in 2009, but it was Newport County's first final and their debut visit to Wembley in their 100-year history.

Newport County defeated Forest Green Rovers, Worksop Town, Carshalton Athletic, Northwich Victoria and Wealdstone en route to the Final.

York City defeated Solihull Moors, Salisbury City, Ebbsfleet United, Grimsby Town, and Luton Town en route to the final.

One lifelong Newport County fan, 95-year-old Ron Jones, uncle of chairman Chris Blight, was reported to have been looking forward to the game after having watched the club home and away for most of his life.

York City won the match 2-0 thanks to goals from Matty Blair and Lanre Oyebanjo.

== Route to the final ==
=== Newport County ===
| Date Round | Home team | Score | Away team | Venue |

| 10 December 2011 1 | Newport County | 0–0 | Forest Green Rovers | Newport |
| 15:00 | | | | Stadium: Newport Stadium; Attendance: 724; Referee: Amy Fearn |

| 13 December 2011 1r | Forest Green Rovers | 0–2 | Newport County | Nailsworth |
| 19:45 | | | McAllister 33'; Knights 68' | Stadium: The New Lawn; Attendance: 368; Referee: Rob Merchant |

| 24 January 2012 2 | Worksop Town | 1–3 | Newport County | Retford |
| 19:45 | McDonald 70' | | Buchanan 58'; Harris 87', 90' | Stadium: Cannon Park; Attendance: 538; Referee: J. Simpson |

| 7 February 2012 3 | Newport County | 4–0 | Carshalton Athletic | Newport |
| 19:45 | Foley 4'; Buchanan 36'; Chapman 47'; Rose 88' | | | Stadium: Newport Stadium; Attendance: 975; Referee: R. Whitton |

| 25 February 2012 QF | Northwich Victoria | 2–3 | Newport County | Macclesfield |
| 15:00 | Kearney 36'; Wade 47' | | Harris 59', 84'; Jarvis 89' | Stadium: Moss Rose; Attendance: 601; Referee: J. Simpson |

| 10 March 2012 SF-1 | Newport County | 3–1 | Wealdstone | Newport |
| 15:00 | Buchanan 6'; Jarvis 24'; Knights 79' | | Jolly 49' | Stadium: Newport Stadium; Attendance: 2,209; Referee: Oliver Langford |

| 17 March 2012 SF-2 | Wealdstone | 0–0 (1–3 agg.) | Newport County | Ruislip |
| 15:00 | | | | Stadium: Grosvenor Vale; Attendance: 2,092; Referee: James Linington |

=== York City ===
| Date | Home team | Score | Away team | Venue |

| 10 December 2011 1 | York City | 2–2 | Solihull Moors | York |
| 15:00 | Blair 6'; Challinor 90+3' | | Fitzpatrick 3'; R Walker 40' | Stadium: Bootham Crescent; Attendance: 1,116; Referee: Anthony Backhouse |

| 13 December 2011 1r | Solihull Moors | 0–3 | York City | Solihull |
| 19:45 | | | Smith 61'; Blair 61', 76' | Stadium: Damson Park; Attendance: 275; Referee: Rob Whitton |

| 14 January 2012 2 | Salisbury City | 2–6 | York City | Salisbury |
| 15:00 | Reid 36', 81' (pen.) | | Blair 19', 21'; Reed 26'; McLaughlin 34', 87'; Blinkhorn 70' | Stadium: The Raymond McEnhill Stadium; Attendance: 827; Referee: Steve Bratt |

| 14 February 2012 3 | York City | 1–0 | Ebbsfleet United | York |
| 15:00 | Blair 48' | | | Stadium: Bootham Crescent; Attendance: 1,419; Referee: Richard Clark |

| 25 February 2012 QF | Grimsby Town | 0–1 | York City | Cleethorpes |
| 15:00 | | | Kerr 83' | Stadium: Blundell Park; Attendance: 3,662; Referee: Steve Bratt |

| 10 March 2012 SF-1 | York City | 1–0 | Luton Town | York |
| 15:00 | Reed 14' (pen.) | | | Stadium: Bootham Crescent; Attendance: 3,365; Referee: Paul Tierney |

| 17 March 2012 SF-2 | Luton Town | 1–1 (1–2 agg.) | York City | Luton |
| 15:00 | Willmott 43' | | Blair 90' | Stadium: Kenilworth Road; Attendance: 5,796; Referee: Andy Woolmer |

== Match ==
=== Details ===
12 May 2012
15:00 GMT

| Newport County | 0–2 | York City |
|---|---|---|
| | Report | Blair 65'; Oyebanjo 72' |

Wembley Stadium, London
Attendance: 19,844
Referee: Anthony Taylor

| Newport County | York City |

| GK | 18 | (England) Glyn Thompson |
| RB | 19 | (Wales) David Pipe |
| CB | 5 | (England) Gary Warren (c) |
| CB | 6 | (England) Ismail Yakubu |
| LB | 16 | (Wales) Andrew Hughes |
| RM | 42 | (England) Max Porter | (yellow card) 42' | (substituted off) 80' |
| CM | 10 | (Republic of Ireland) Sam Foley |
| LM | 36 | (Wales) Lee Evans |
| FW | 15 | (Wales) Nathaniel Jarvis | | (substituted off) 69' |
| FW | 30 | (England) Lee Minshull |
| FW | 31 | (England) Romone Rose | (yellow card) 66' | (substituted off) 69' |
Substitutes:
| GK | 39 | (Wales) Matthew Swann |
| DF | 25 | (England) Paul Rodgers |
| MF | 11 | (England) Darryl Knights | | (substituted on) 80' |
| FW | 23 | (England) Jake Harris | | (substituted on) 69' |
| FW | 26 | (England) Elliott Buchanan | | (substituted on) 69' |
Manager:
(England) Justin Edinburgh

| GK | 24 | (Northern Ireland) Michael Ingham |
| RB | 20 | (England) Jon Challinor |
| CB | 4 | (England) Chris Smith (c) | (yellow card) 21' |
| CB | 6 | (Wales) Daniel Parslow |
| LB | 27 | (England) Ben Gibson |
| CM | 2 | (Republic of Ireland) Lanre Oyebanjo |
| CM | 3 | (Australia) James Meredith |
| CM | 26 | (Northern Ireland) Paddy McLaughlin | | (substituted off) 83' |
| FW | 17 | (England) Matty Blair |
| FW | 9 | (England) Jason Walker | | (substituted off) 90' |
| FW | 10 | (England) Ashley Chambers | | (substituted off) 90' |
Substitutes:
| GK | 1 | (England) Paul Musselwhite |
| DF | 16 | (England) Jamal Fyfield | | (substituted on) 83' |
| MF | 14 | (England) Michael Potts |
| MF | 18 | (Portugal) Adriano Moke | | (substituted on) 90' |
| FW | 7 | (Wales) Jamie Reed | | (substituted on) 90' |
Manager:
(England) Gary Mills
