= Matty Blair =

English footballer (born 1989)

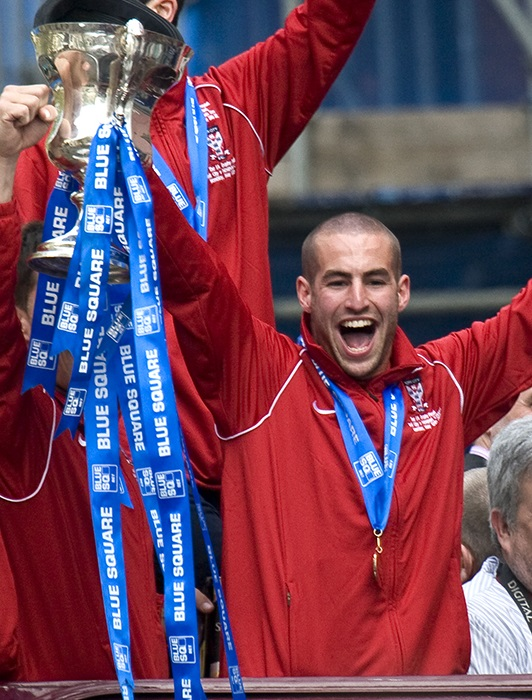
- Blair with the parade that followed York City's victory in the 2012 Conference Premier play-off final

Personal information
- Full name: Matthew James Blair
- Date of birth: 21 June 1989 (age 37)
- Place of birth: Warwick, England
- Height: 5 ft 10 in (1.78 m)
- Position: Right back

Senior career*
Years	Team	Apps	(Gls)
2007–2008	Racing Club Warwick		
2008–2009	Stratford Town	40	(7)
2009	Bedworth United	9	(2)
2009–2010	Redditch United	15	(2)
2010	A.F.C. Telford United	7	(1)
2010–2011	Kidderminster Harriers	43	(11)
2011–2013	York City	85	(16)
2013–2015	Fleetwood Town	32	(3)
2014	→ Northampton Town (loan)	3	(1)
2014	→ Cambridge United (loan)	2	(0)
2015–2016	Mansfield Town	35	(2)
2016–2020	Doncaster Rovers	139	(8)
2020–2022	Cheltenham Town	50	(3)

International career
2011–2012	England C	2	(0)
- * Club domestic league appearances and goals as of 18:59, 12 September 2021 (UTC)

Matthew James Blair (born 21 June 1989) is an English former professional footballer who last played as a right back for club Cheltenham Town.

Blair started his career with Racing Club Warwick and after one season with the club signed for Stratford Town in 2008. He left for Bedworth United a year later, before going on to have spells with Redditch United and A.F.C. Telford United in the Conference North. He joined Kidderminster Harriers of the Conference Premier in 2010 and after one season signed for York City. He scored in the 2012 FA Trophy Final and 2012 Conference Premier play-off final at Wembley Stadium, and his winning goal in the latter saw York promoted into League Two. After one season with York in League Two, Blair signed for divisional rivals Fleetwood Town in 2013 and was released in January 2015.

== Club career ==
=== Early career ===
Born in Warwick, Warwickshire, Blair started his career in the Midland Football Alliance with his hometown club, Racing Club Warwick, in the 2007–08 season. He signed for Stratford Town of the Midland Football Alliance on 7 July 2008. After signing, manager Micky Moore said of Blair: "He had an excellent season with Racing Club Warwick and I feel coming to Stratford and its environment will make him a better player". He finished 2008–09 with seven goals in 40 league appearances for Stratford.

Blair signed for Southern League Division One Central club Bedworth United on 3 June 2009. He scored four times for Bedworth in 16 appearances before signing for Conference North club Redditch United on 25 November 2009. Having made 15 appearances and scored two goals for Redditch, Blair moved on again, signing for Conference North rivals A.F.C. Telford United on 19 March 2010. He finished 2009–10 with one goal in seven appearances for Telford.

=== Kidderminster Harriers ===
Blair signed for Conference Premier club Kidderminster Harriers on 9 August 2010 on non-contract terms following a trial. He made his debut on 14 August 2010 as a 75th-minute substitute in Kidderminster's 2010–11 opening day 2–1 victory away to York City. His first goal for the club came after scoring with a low shot in the 75th minute of a 2–1 win at home to Gateshead on 5 October 2010. In the following match, Blair scored twice as Kidderminster beat Grimsby Town 3–2 on 10 October 2010. Blair signed a contract until the end of 2010–11 on 18 October 2010. His first hat-trick for Kidderminster came after scoring all three of their goals in a 3–3 draw away to Grimsby on 9 April 2011, including an 83rd-minute equaliser after latching onto a loose ball in the penalty area. He finished the season with 11 goals in 45 appearances for Kidderminster.

=== York City ===
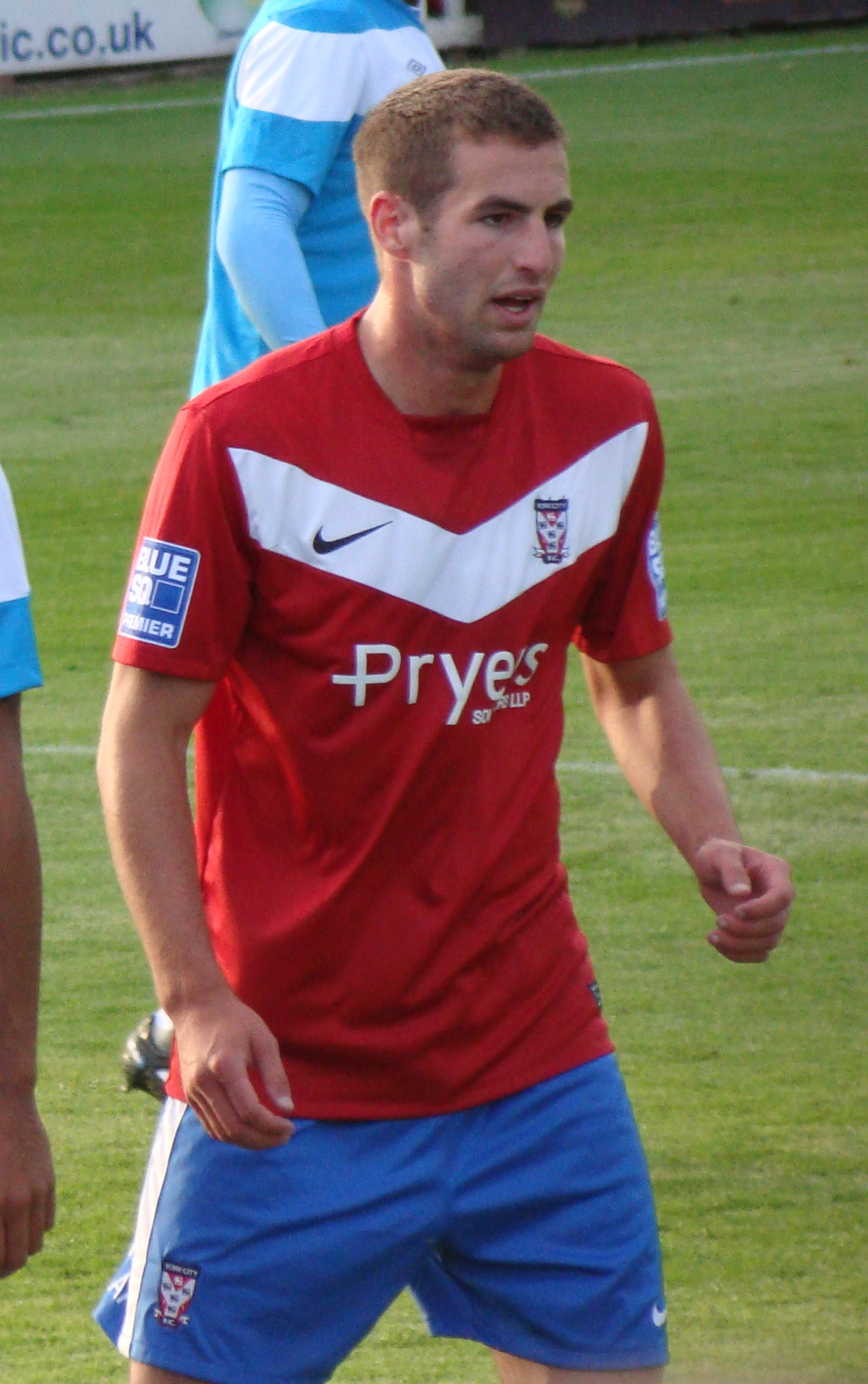
Blair playing for York City in 2011

After turning down a new contract with Kidderminster, Blair signed for Conference Premier rivals York City on 1 June 2011 on a two-year contract. A compensation package was agreed by the two clubs later that month. He made his debut in York's opening match of 2011–12, a 2–1 victory away to Ebbsfleet United on 13 August 2011. His first goal came in the following match with York's final goal in a 3–1 victory at home to Barrow on 16 August 2011, with a sidefooted shot from six yards in the fifth minute of stoppage time. Blair scored the equaliser to give York a 1–1 away draw to Luton Town in the FA Trophy semi-final second leg with a 90th-minute header from a Jamal Fyfield cross. York progressed to the final with a 2–1 aggregate victory.

With a 111th-minute header from a Jason Walker cross, Blair scored the winning goal for York away to Mansfield Town during extra time of their play-off semi-final second leg on 7 May 2012. He scored the opening goal for York in their 2–0 victory over Newport County in the 2012 FA Trophy Final at Wembley Stadium on 12 May 2012, after lifting the ball 20 yards into an empty net after goalkeeper Glyn Thompson had charged out of his goal. Eight days later, Blair scored the winning goal in York's 2–1 victory over Luton in the 2012 Conference Premier play-off final at Wembley Stadium. He scored in the 47th minute with a sidefooted shot from four yards after the ball was head down by Daniel Parslow, and the goal was allowed despite Blair being in an offside position. This result meant York were promoted into League Two after an eight-year absence from the Football League. He finished his first season at York as top scorer with 20 goals in 52 appearances, and was named in the 2011–12 Conference Premier Team of the Year alongside York teammate James Meredith.

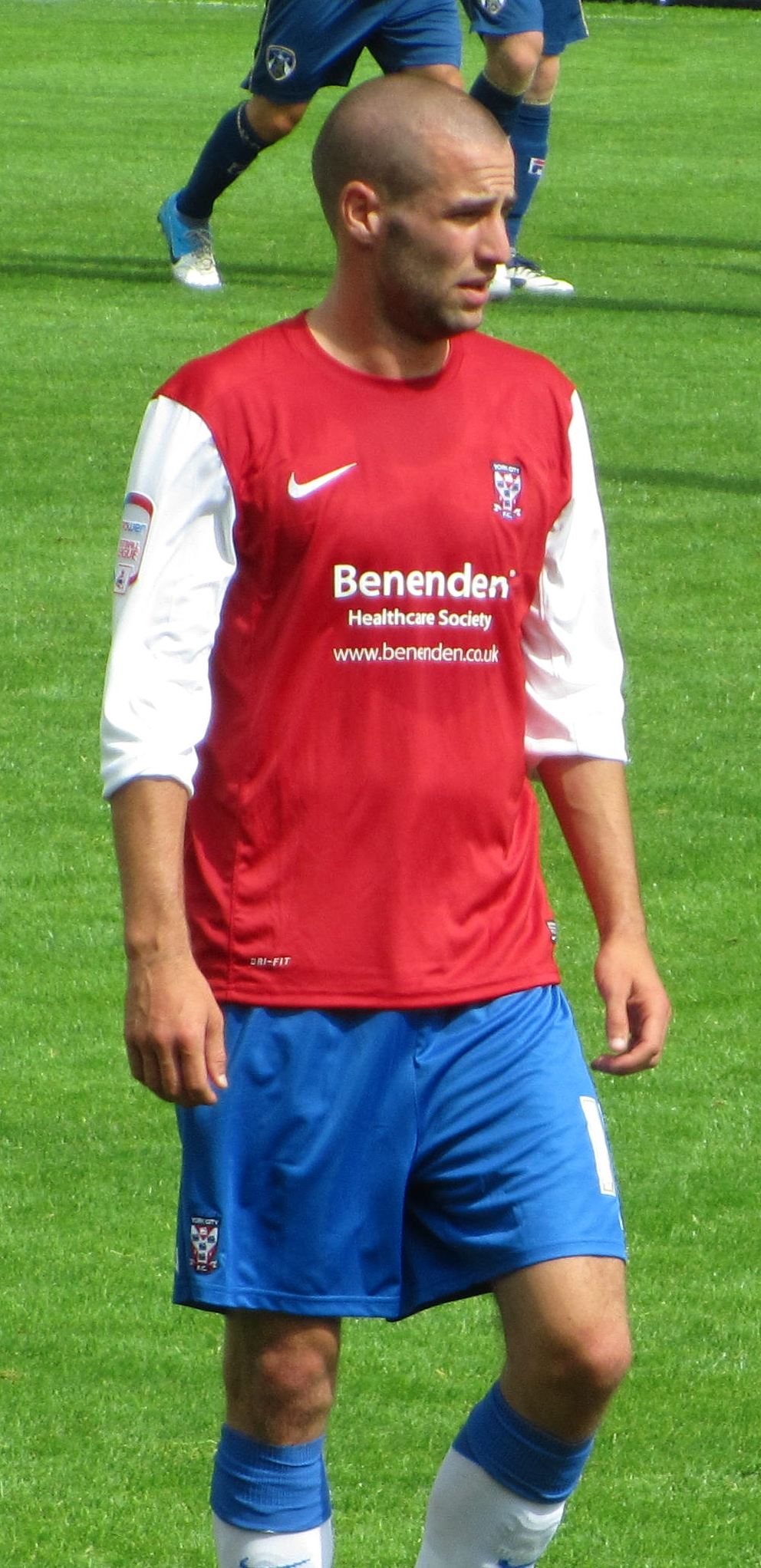
Blair playing for York City in 2012

Blair came on as a 78th-minute substitute in York's 2012–13 opener away to League One team Doncaster Rovers in the League Cup first round on 11 August 2012. Following a 1–1 draw after extra time the team lost 4–2 in a penalty shoot-out, with Blair missing the final penalty kick. He then entered York's first Football League fixture since their promotion, a 3–1 defeat at home to Wycombe Wanderers on 18 August 2012, as a 56th-minute substitute. His first goal of the season came with the 80th-minute winner in York's 1–0 victory away to Rotherham United in the Football League Trophy first round Northern section. He finished the season with seven goals in 49 appearances.

=== Fleetwood Town ===
Following discussions with York manager Nigel Worthington, Blair expressed his desire to look for another club, and was in talks with newly relegated League Two club Portsmouth before asking for more time to consider the move. However, he signed for League Two rivals Fleetwood Town on a two-year contract on 13 May 2013.

Blair joined fellow League Two club Northampton Town on 10 January 2014 on a one-month loan. He made his debut the following day in a 2–0 home defeat to former club York, before scoring a 76th-minute equaliser for Northampton in their 1–1 away draw with Cheltenham Town on 1 February 2014. His loan was ended on 5 February 2014, three days ahead of when it was due to expire, having made three appearances and scored one goal for Northampton. Blair scored the only goal in the play-off semi-final against his former club York, and started for Fleetwood in their 1–0 win over Burton Albion in the 2014 League Two play-off final at Wembley Stadium on 26 May. This result meant they were promoted into League One for the first time in their history. He finished 2013–14 with 33 appearances and five goals for Fleetwood.

On 17 November 2014, Blair joined League Two club Cambridge United on loan until January 2015.

=== Mansfield Town ===
Blair signed for League Two club Mansfield Town on a contract until the end of 2014–15 on 14 January 2015 after leaving Fleetwood by mutual consent.

=== Doncaster Rovers ===
Blair rejected a new contract with Mansfield to sign for newly relegated League Two club Doncaster Rovers on 24 May 2016 on a two-year contract. He made 48 appearances and scored 3 goals in 2016–17 as Doncaster were promoted to League One after finishing third in League Two.

He was named as PFA League One Community Player of the Year in both seasons 2017–18 and 2018–19. In April 2019, Blair was also named as Community Champion by the PFA for the 2018–19 season in recognition of all his community services.

=== Cheltenham Town ===
Blair rejected a new contract offered by Doncaster, and was signed by Cheltenham Town at the beginning of September 2020 on a one-year contract. He made his debut for the club on 8 September 2020 in an EFL Trophy group stage away win over Newport County.

On 12 September 2022, Blair announced his retirement from football due to injury.

== International career ==
Blair made his England national C team debut as a 56th-minute substitute for Connor Franklin in a 1–0 defeat at home to Portugal in the 2009–11 International Challenge Trophy on 19 May 2011. His second and final cap came after starting England's 1–1 draw at home to Italy in the 2011–13 International Challenge Trophy on 28 February 2012.

== Personal life ==
Blair is the son of former professional footballer Andy Blair. His sister-in-law is actress Holly Matthews, who was married to his brother Ross up until his death from a brain tumour.

== Career statistics ==
As of match played 8 May 2021

Appearances and goals by club, season and competition
Club	Season	League			FA Cup		League Cup		Other		Total	
Club	Season	Division	Apps	Goals	Apps	Goals	Apps	Goals	Apps	Goals	Apps	Goals
Stratford Town	2008–09	Midland Football Alliance	40	7			—				40	7
Bedworth United	2009–10	Southern League Division; One Central	9	2	6	2	—		1 (Note: Appearance in FA Trophy)	0	16	4
Redditch United	2009–10	Conference North	15	2	—		—		—		15	2
A.F.C. Telford United	2009–10	Conference North	7	1	—		—		—		7	1
Kidderminster Harriers	2010–11	Conference Premier	43	11	1	0	—		1	0	45	11
York City	2011–12	Conference Premier	41	10	1	0	—		10 (Note: Seven appearances and eight goals in FA Trophy, three appearances and two goals in Conference Premier play-offs)	10	52	20
York City	2012–13	League Two	44	6	2	0	1	0	2 (Note: Appearance(s) in Football League Trophy)	1	49	7
York City	Total		85	16	3	0	1	0	12	11	101	27
Fleetwood Town	2013–14	League Two	24	3	2	0	1	0	6 (Note: Three appearances and one goal in Football League Trophy, three appearances and one goal in League Two play-offs)	2	33	5
Fleetwood Town	2014–15	League One	8	0	0	0	1	0	1	0	10	0
Fleetwood Town	Total		32	3	2	0	2	0	7	2	43	5
Northampton Town (loan)	2013–14	League Two	3	1	—		—		—		3	1
Cambridge United (loan)	2014–15	League Two	2	0	2	0	—		—		4	0
Mansfield Town	2014–15	League Two	3	0	—		—		—		3	0
Mansfield Town	2015–16	League Two	32	2	2	0	0	0	0	0	34	2
Mansfield Town	Total		35	2	2	0	0	0	0	0	37	2
Doncaster Rovers	2016–17	League Two	45	3	1	0	1	0	1 (Note: Appearance(s) in EFL Trophy)	0	48	3
Doncaster Rovers	2017–18	League One	40	2	3	0	2	0	1	0	46	2
Doncaster Rovers	2018–19	League One	42	3	6	1	2	0	4 (Note: Two appearances in EFL Trophy, two appearances and one goal in League One play-offs)	1	54	5
Doncaster Rovers	2019–20	League One	12	0	0	0	1	0	1	0	14	0
Doncaster Rovers	Total		139	8	10	1	6	0	7	1	162	10
Cheltenham Town	2020–21	League Two	44	2	4	0	1	0	3	0	52	2
Career total			454	55	30	3	10	0	31	14	525	72

== Honours ==
York City

- Conference Premier play-offs: 2012
- FA Trophy: 2011–12

Fleetwood Town

- Football League Two play-offs: 2014

Doncaster Rovers

- EFL League Two third-place promotion: 2016–17

Cheltenham Town

- EFL League Two: 2020–21

Individual

- Conference Premier Team of the Year: 2011–12
