= Danny Rose (footballer, born 1988) =

English footballer (born 1988)

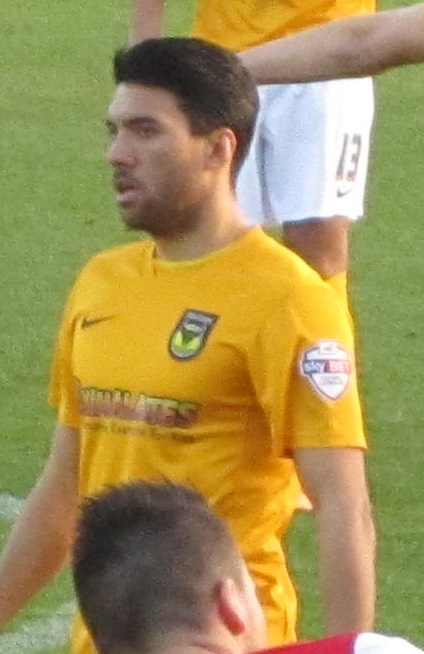
- Rose playing for Oxford United in 2013

Personal information
- Full name: Daniel Stephen Rose
- Date of birth: 21 February 1988 (age 38)
- Place of birth: Bristol, England
- Height: 5 ft 8 in (1.73 m)
- Position: Midfielder

Team information
- Current team: Salford City (head of academy coaching)

Youth career
- 2002–2006: Manchester United

Senior career*
Years	Team	Apps	(Gls)
2006–2007	Manchester United	0	(0)
2007	→ Oxford United (loan)	22	(1)
2007–2008	Oxford United	19	(0)
2008–2012	Newport County	149	(33)
2012–2013	Fleetwood Town	10	(2)
2012–2013	→ Aldershot Town (loan)	34	(2)
2013–2016	Oxford United	82	(6)
2016	Northampton Town	15	(1)
2016–2019	Portsmouth	54	(5)
2019–2020	Swindon Town	29	(1)
2020–2022	Grimsby Town	22	(0)
2021–2022	→ Darlington (loan)	25	(0)
2022–2023	Darlington	19	(1)
2023	Cleethorpes Town	3	(0)
2024	Cleethorpes Town	2	(0)
Total		485	(52)

International career
2012	England C	1	(0)

Managerial career
- 2023: Darlington (caretaker manager)
- * Club domestic league appearances and goals as of 19:01, 20 September 2023 (UTC)

Daniel Stephen Rose (born 21 February 1988) is an English football coach and former footballer. He is Head of Academy coaching at Salford City.

As a player he was a midfielder and is a former captain of Manchester United Reserves, Rose joined Oxford United in 2007 following a four-month loan spell. He switched to Newport County the following year, and helped Newport to the Conference South title in 2009–10. He was sold to Fleetwood Town in January 2012, and was part of the side that won the Conference Premier title in 2011–12, before returning to Oxford in June 2013. After a short spell with Northampton Town in 2016, he spent three seasons at Portsmouth and one with Swindon Town before signing for Grimsby Town in 2020. He spent time on loan at Darlington in 2021–22 before joining on a permanent contract. He retired following a brief spell at Cleethorpes Town at beginning of the 2023–24 season. He captained the England C team in 2012.

== Club career ==
=== Manchester United ===
Rose began his career with Premier League giants Manchester United, spending five years at Old Trafford. Though he captained the Reserve side, he never played a senior game for the Red Devils.

He was loaned out to Oxford United in January 2007, and remained at the Kassam Stadium until the end of the 2006–07 season.

=== Oxford United ===
He impressed with his "sparkling displays" during his 22 Conference National appearances, and was signed on a month-to-month contract by manager Jim Smith in summer 2007. This came despite the Oxford Mail's report that he was "being chased by a number of Championship and League One sides – making a return to Oxford United seem highly unlikely". He made 19 appearances in 2007–08, before moving on to Newport County of the Conference South.

=== Newport County ===
He scored 10 goals in 2008–09, as Dean Holdsworth's side finished a disappointing 10th. He made 40 starts in 2009–10; Newport were crowned Conference South champions with a record 103 points, 28 points ahead of second-placed Dover Athletic. He started 50 matches in 2010–11, in which season Newport missed out on the Conference Premier play-offs by four places and nine points. He made 25 appearances in 2011–12 before being signed by Fleetwood Town for an undisclosed fee in January 2012. The move came despite interest from Football League clubs Aldershot Town (managed by Dean Holdsworth) and Crystal Palace (where he had a week-long trial). He had scored a total of 36 goals in 165 appearances in all competitions for Newport, including a hat-trick past Kettering Town on 18 October 2011.

=== Fleetwood Town ===
Fleetwood won the Conference title in 2011–12, winning promotion to the Football League for the first time in the club's history.

In October 2012, Rose rejoined Dean Holdsworth at Aldershot Town on a three-month loan.

=== Return to Oxford United ===
On 13 June 2013, Rose joined Oxford United for the third time in his career. He signed a two-year deal with an option of a third. On 1 February 2016 he left the club by mutual consent. He later signed for Northampton Town.

=== Northampton Town ===
On 1 February 2016, Rose completed a switch to Northampton Town, rejoining former Oxford manager Chris Wilder. He scored his first goal for the club in a 1–0 win over Wycombe Wanderers on 20 February 2016.

=== Portsmouth ===
On 3 June 2016, Rose joined Portsmouth. He scored his first goal for the club in a 5–1 win over Barnet on 24 September 2016. He was a key member of the team that won the League Two title in 2016–17. On 30 December 2017, in a match against Northampton Town, Rose broke his leg. The injury would see him sidelined for the remainder of the season, but he signed a one-year contract extension in March 2018. He made one further League appearance for the club in August.

=== Swindon Town ===
On 17 January 2019, Rose joined League Two club Swindon Town, signing a contract until the end of the 2018–19 season with the option of a further year. Rose signed a 1-year extension for the 2019–2020 season.

=== Grimsby Town ===
On 31 August 2020, Rose signed a two-year deal with Grimsby Town becoming Ian Holloway's sixth signing of the summer.

After Grimsby's relegation from the Football League at the end of the 2020–21 season, Rose was deemed surplus to requirements by manager Paul Hurst and was made available on a free transfer.

Rose was not handed a squad number for the 2021–22 season, and joined National League North club Darlington on a one-month loan on 8 October 2021. After he played three matches in the initial month, his loan was extended, first for a further two months and then to the end of the season.

On 12 May 2022, following his return from Darlington, it was confirmed that Grimsby would not be renewing his contract and that he would depart at the end of the season.

Grimsby secured promotion with victory in the play-off final, though Rose was not in the matchday squad at London Stadium.

=== Darlington ===
On the same day as his departure from Grimsby was announced, Darlington announced Rose would be joining on a permanent deal. Rose himself later confirmed via Twitter that he was arriving in a player/coach capacity. He played in about half of Darlington's fixtures over the 2022–23 season.

=== Cleethorpes Town ===
Rose returned to the Grimsby area by signing for Northern Premier League Division One East club Cleethorpes Town for the 2023–24 season.

== International career ==
Rose captained the England C team in a 1–1 draw with Italy at Highbury Stadium, Fleetwood, on 28 February 2012.

== Coaching career ==
On 20 September 2023, Rose was appointed assistant manager of former club Darlington, assisting newly appointed manager Josh Gowling. After Gowling was sacked on 26 December, Rose stayed on as caretaker manager, taking charge of a defeat at home to Scarborough Athletic, before leaving the club after Steve Watson was appointed manager.

In January 2024, Rose returned to former club Swindon Town in the role of Youth Development Phase Lead Coach.

In December 2024, he joined Salford City as Head of Academy coaching.

== Career statistics ==
Appearances and goals by club, season and competition
Club	Season	League			FA Cup		League Cup		Other		Total	
Club	Season	Division	Apps	Goals	Apps	Goals	Apps	Goals	Apps	Goals	Apps	Goals
Manchester United	2006–07	Premier League	0	0	0	0	0	0	0	0	0	0
Oxford United (loan)	2006–07	Conference Premier	22	1	0	0	—		2 (Note: Appearances in FA Trophy)	1	24	2
Oxford United	2007–08	Conference Premier	19	0	1	0	—		2 (Note: One appearance in FA Trophy, one in Conference League Cup)	0	22	0
Oxford United	Total		41	1	1	0	—		4	1	46	2
Newport County	2008–09	Conference South	41	8	2	1	—		4 (Note: Three appearances and one goal in FA Trophy, one appearance and one goal in Conference League Cup)	2	47	11
Newport County	2009–10	Conference South	38	8	2	0	—		4	0	44	8
Newport County	2010–11	Conference Premier	46	6	1	0	—		3	0	50	6
Newport County	2011–12	Conference Premier	24	11	2	0	—		2	0	28	11
Newport County	Total		149	33	7	1	—		13	2	169	36
Fleetwood Town	2011–12	Conference Premier	10	2	0	0	—		0	0	10	2
Fleetwood Town	2012–13	League Two	0	0	0	0	0	0	0	0	0	0
Fleetwood Town	Total		10	2	0	0	0	0	0	10	2	
Aldershot Town (loan)	2012–13	League Two	34	2	3	0	0	0	0	0	37	2
Oxford United	2013–14	League Two	40	4	3	1	1	0	0	0	44	5
Oxford United	2014–15	League Two	29	2	3	1	1	0	1 (Note: Appearance(s) in Football League Trophy)	0	34	3
Oxford United	2015–16	League Two	13	0	3	0	2	0	1	0	19	0
Oxford United	Total		82	6	9	2	4	0	2	0	97	8
Northampton Town	2015–16	League Two	15	1	0	0	0	0	0	0	15	1
Portsmouth	2016–17	League Two	38	5	1	0	0	0	1 (Note: Appearance(s) in EFL Trophy)	0	40	5
Portsmouth	2017–18	League One	15	0	0	0	1	0	3	0	19	0
Portsmouth	2018–19	League One	1	0	0	0	0	0	4	0	5	0
Portsmouth	Total		54	5	1	0	1	0	8	0	64	5
Swindon Town	2018–19	League Two	10	0	0	0	0	0	0	0	10	0
Swindon Town	2019–20	League Two	19	1	2	0	0	0	2	0	23	1
Swindon Town	Total		29	1	2	0	0	0	2	0	33	1
Grimsby Town	2020–21	League Two	22	0	1	0	1	0	2	0	26	0
Grimsby Town	2021–22	National League	0	0	0	0	—		0	0	0	0
Grimsby Town	Total		22	0	1	0	1	0	2	0	26	0
Darlington (loan)	2021–22	National League North	25	0	0	0	—		0	0	25	0
Darlington	2022–23	National League North	19	1	1	0	—		2	0	22	1
Darlington	Total		44	1	1	0	—		2	0	47	1
Cleethorpes Town	2023–24	NPL Division One East	3	0	3	0	—		1	0	7	0
Career total			483	52	28	3	6	0	34	3	551	58

== Honours ==
Newport County

- Conference South: 2009–10

Fleetwood Town

- Conference Premier: 2011–12

Northampton Town

- Football League Two: 2015–16

Portsmouth

- EFL League Two: 2016–17

Swindon Town

- EFL League Two: 2019–20
