= 1985–86 Newport County A.F.C. season =

Welsh association football club season

Newport County
1985–86 season
- Chairman: Archie Menzies
- Manager: Bobby Smith (until 25 March 1986); John Relish (from 25 March 1986)
- Stadium: Somerton Park
- Third Division: 19th
- FA Cup: Third round
- League Cup: First round
- Welsh Cup: Fourth round
- Top goalscorer: League: Staniforth (9); All: Mardenborough (11)
- Highest home attendance: 6,449 vs Reading (12 October 1985)
- Lowest home attendance: 1,508 vs Brentford (11 March 1986)
- Average home league attendance: 2,536
Home colours	Away colours

The 1985–86 season was Newport County's sixth consecutive season in the Third Division and their 58th season overall in the Football League.

== Season review ==
=== Results summary ===
Note: Three points for a win

Overall								Home						Away					
Pld	W	D	L	GF	GA	GD	Pts	W	D	L	GF	GA	GD	W	D	L	GF	GA	GD
46	11	18	17	52	65	−13	51	7	8	8	35	33	+2	4	10	9	17	32	−15

Last updated: 3 May 1986.

=== Results by round ===
Round	1	2	3	4	5	6	7	8	9	10	11	12	13	14	15	16	17	18	19	20	21	22	23	24	25	26	27	28	29	30	31	32	33	34	35	36	37	38	39	40	41	42	43	44	45	46
Ground	H	A	H	A	H	A	A	H	A	H	A	H	A	H	A	H	H	A	H	H	H	A	A	H	A	H	A	A	H	A	H	A	H	H	A	A	H	A	H	A	H	A	H	H	A	A
Result	D	W	L	W	W	L	D	L	L	D	D	L	D	D	D	D	D	L	L	D	W	D	D	W	D	W	L	D	W	L	L	L	L	L	L	L	L	D	W	L	D	W	D	W	W	D
Position	10	6	13	8	2	7	9	12	14	16	16	18	19	19	18	18	18	18	19	19	19	19	19	18	18	14	18	17	15	17	17	18	18	18	20	20	20	20	19	20	20	20	20	20	19	19

Updated to match(es) played on 3 May 1986. Source: statto.com
A = Away; H = Home; W = Win; D = Draw; L = Loss

== Fixtures and results ==
=== Third Division ===
Date	Opponents	Venue	Result	Scorers	Attendance
17 Aug 1985	Doncaster Rovers	H	2–2	Boyle, Carter	2,375
24 Aug 1985	Wolverhampton Wanderers	A	2–1	Miles 2	6,073
26 Aug 1985	Cardiff City	H	1–2	Carter	5,027
31 Aug 1985	Bournemouth	A	1–0	Carter	3,381
7 Sep 1985	Bristol Rovers	H	3–0	James, Staniforth, Dowman	2,775
14 Sep 1985	Plymouth Argyle	A	0–2		3,686
17 Sep 1985	Swansea City	A	1–1	Boyle	5,534
21 Sep 1985	Bolton Wanderers	H	0–1		2,212
28 Sep 1985	Walsall	A	0–2		4,586
1 Oct 1985	Bristol City	H	1–1	Lewis	3,776
5 Oct 1985	Lincoln City	A	1–1	Staniforth	1,989
12 Oct 1985	Reading	H	0–2		6,449
19 Oct 1985	Brentford	A	0–0		3,646
22 Oct 1985	Rotherham United	H	0–0		1,817
26 Oct 1985	Wigan Athletic	A	0–0		3,719
2 Nov 1985	Gillingham	H	1–1	P.Jones	1,970
6 Nov 1985	York City	H	1–1	OG	1,529
9 Nov 1985	Chesterfield	A	1–3	Gill	2,420
23 Nov 1985	Notts County	H	1–2	Carter	1,946
14 Dec 1985	Blackpool	H	1–1	Berry	1,991
21 Dec 1985	Wolverhampton Wanderers	H	3–1	Mardernborough 2, Boyle	2,222
26 Dec 1985	Bury	A	1–1	Mardenborough	3,013
28 Dec 1985	Cardiff City	A	1–1	Staniforth	7,450
11 Jan 1986	Bournemouth	H	2–1	Boyle, Staniforth	2,333
18 Jan 1986	Doncaster Rovers	A	1–1	Relish	2,336
25 Jan 1986	Plymouth Argyle	H	3–1	Staniforth, Berry, OG	3,007
1 Feb 1986	Bristol Rovers	A	0–2		3,284
4 Feb 1986	Rotherham United	A	0–0		2,975
16 Feb 1986	Swansea City	H	2–0	Relish, Mayes	2,805
22 Feb 1986	Bolton Wanderers	A	0–4		4,063
28 Feb 1986	Walsall	H	1–5	Boyle	1,530
4 Mar 1986	Bristol City	A	1–3	Mardenborough	4,395
8 Mar 1986	Lincoln City	H	1–2	James	1,540
11 Mar 1986	Brentford	H	1–2	Berry	1,508
15 Mar 1986	Reading	A	0–2		4,783
18 Mar 1986	Darlington	A	2–3	Carter, Latchford	2,508
22 Mar 1986	Wigan Athletic	H	3–4	Latchford 2, Mardenborough	1,700
29 Mar 1986	Derby County	A	1–1	Carter	11,251
31 Mar 1986	Bury	H	1–0	Staniforth	1,983
5 Apr 1986	York City	A	1–3	Lewis	3,038
12 Apr 1986	Chesterfield	H	3–3	Carter, Latchford, Staniforth	1,940
19 Apr 1986	Notts County	A	2–1	Staniforth, Mardenborough	3,279
22 Apr 1986	Derby County	H	1–1	Boyle	3,049
26 Apr 1986	Darlington	H	3–0	Mardenborough, Latchford, Staniforth	2,848
29 Apr 1986	Gillingham	A	1–0	L.Jones	2,566
3 May 1986	Blackpool	A	0–0		3,407

=== FA Cup ===
Round	Date	Opponents	Venue	Result	Scorers	Attendance
1	16 Nov 1985	Southend United	A	1–0	Mardenborough	3,343
2	7 Dec 1985	Torquay United	H	1–1	Berry	2,386
2r	10 Dec 1985	Torquay United	A	3–2 a.e.t.	P.Jones, Boyle, James	1,937
3	4 Jan 1986	Sunderland	A	0–2		12,352

=== Football League Cup ===
Round	Date	Opponents	Venue	Result	Scorers	Attendance	Notes
1–1	20 Aug 1985	Bristol Rovers	A	0–2		2,777	
1–2	3 Sep 1985	Bristol Rovers	H	1–0	Reck	2,012	1–2 agg

=== Welsh Cup ===
Round	Date	Opponents	Venue	Result	Scorers	Attendance
3	26 Nov 1985	Ton Pentre	A	4–2	Mardenborough 2, L.Jones, OG	1,200
4	14 Jan 1986	Kidderminster Harriers	H	3–3	Gill 2, L.Jones	1,138
4r	3 Feb 1986	Kidderminster Harriers	A	1–2	Gill	1,008

=== League table ===
Pos	Team	Pld	W	D	L	GF	GA	GD	Pts	Promotion or relegation
17	Chesterfield	46	13	14	19	61	64	−3	53	
18	Bolton Wanderers	46	15	8	23	54	68	−14	53	
19	Newport County	46	11	18	17	52	65	−13	51	
20	Bury	46	12	13	21	63	67	−4	49	
21	Lincoln City (R)	46	10	16	20	55	77	−22	46	Relegation to the Fourth Division

(R) Relegated
