= Felino Jardim =

Dutch football midfielder (born 1985)

Personal information
- Date of birth: 10 August 1985 (age 41)
- Place of birth: Rotterdam, Netherlands
- Height: 1.63 m (5 ft 4 in)
- Position: Midfielder

Team information
- Current team: Nieuw-Lekkerland

Senior career*
Years	Team	Apps	(Gls)
2004–2005	Feyenoord	0	(0)
2005–2006	RKC Waalwijk	0	(0)
2006–2008	Sparta	0	(0)
2008–2009	Cambridge United	22	(2)
2009–2010	RBC	24	(0)
2010–2011	Rayong	25	(3)
2011–2012	Newport County	8	(0)
2012–2014	Xerxes		
2014–2015	Capelle	26	(0)
2015–2020	Spijkenisse		
2020–	Nieuw-Lekkerland		

International career
- Netherlands U19
- * Club domestic league appearances and goals as of 22:27, 2 March 2012 (UTC)

Felino Jardim (born 10 August 1985) is a Dutch footballer who plays as a midfielder for Nieuw-Lekkerland.

== Career ==
He has previously played for Feyenoord, RKC Waalwijk and Sparta Rotterdam, as well as being capped at under-17 and under-19 level for the Netherlands. Despite this, he managed just a handful of senior appearances including coming on as a substitute in the Eredivisie playoffs for RKC Waalwijk. After being released by Sparta Rotterdam at the end of the 2007–08 season, he had trials in England with Bedford Town, Cambridge United and Barnet before finally signing a one-year deal with Cambridge United on 7 August 2008.

Jardim scored on his debut for Cambridge on 9 August 2008, in a Conference National match away at Northwich Victoria. He was released in February 2009.

In July 2009 he returned to Holland, and signed with RBC Roosendaal. On 28 July 2011, he signed for Conference National club Newport County and he was released by Newport County in July 2012.

Jardim would later play in the lower tiers of Dutch football, most notably five years for Spijkenisse. In June 2020, he moved to Nieuw-Lekkerland in the Eerste Klasse.
