= Scott Murray (footballer, born 1988) =

Scottish footballer

Personal information
- Date of birth: 3 March 1988 (age 38)
- Place of birth: Glasgow, Scotland
- Height: 6 ft 2 in (1.88 m)
- Position: Goalkeeper

Youth career
- Kilmarnock
- 2004–2005: Dundee

Senior career*
Years	Team	Apps	(Gls)
2005–2007	Dundee	25	(0)
2007–2008	Queens Park	8	(0)
2008	Partick Thistle	0	(0)
- * Club domestic league appearances and goals as of 10:38, 23 October 2008 (UTC)

Scott Murray (born 3 March 1988 in Glasgow) is a Scottish former footballer.

Murray won the Scottish Youth Cup with Kilmarnock in 2004 before being released shortly after. Dundee manager Jim Duffy then signed Murray on a 2-year contract. He made his first team debut against Airdrie in the Scottish Challenge Cup saving two penalties in the penalty shoot-out at the end of the game to send Dundee through to the next round.

He went on to make 25 league and cup appearances for the Dens Park side in the 2005–06 season, winning Young Player of the Month for January 2006. He signed a new 2-year contract in February 2006, while keeping five clean sheets in a row. Scott also represented Scotland at U16, U17 and U19 level.

He left Dundee in August 2007 despite having a year left remaining on his contract, opting to sign for Billy Stark at Queen's Park. On 6 September 2008, Murray signed an amateur contract with Partick Thistle.

Murray also coached at Queen's Park, and ran a coaching programme in Lenzie.

[2]
