= Glyn Thompson =

English footballer (born 1981)

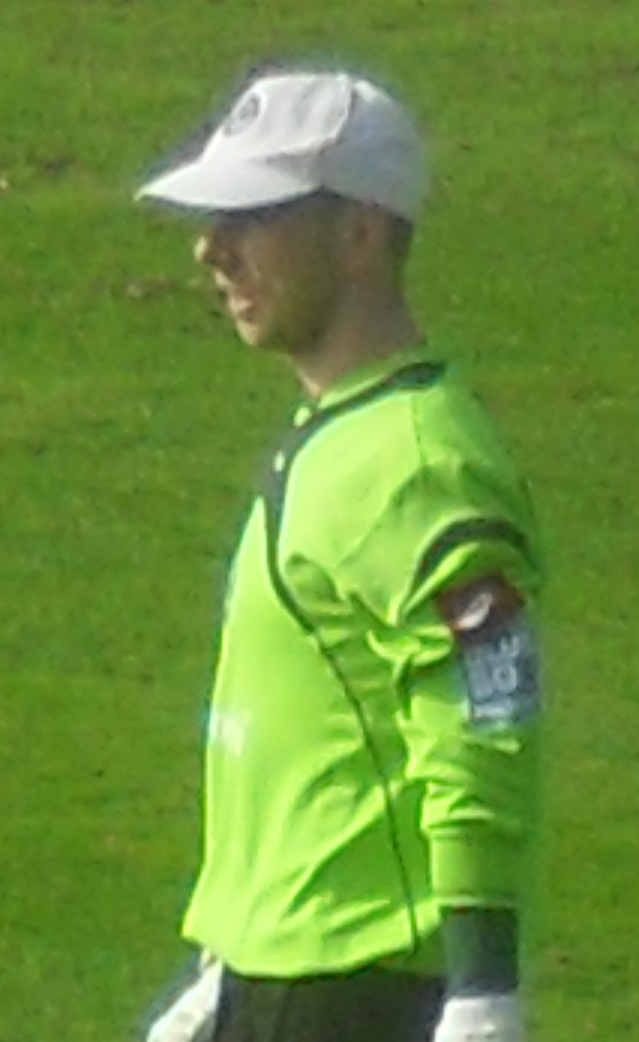
- Thompson playing for Newport County

Personal information
- Full name: Glyn William Thompson
- Date of birth: 24 February 1981 (age 45)
- Place of birth: Telford, England
- Height: 6 ft 3 in (1.91 m)
- Position: Goalkeeper

Youth career
- 1997–1998: Shrewsbury Town

Senior career*
| Years | Team | Apps | (Gls) |
| 1998–1999 | Shrewsbury Town | 1 | (0) |
| 1999–2003 | Fulham | 0 | (0) |
| 2000 | → Mansfield Town (loan) | 16 | (0) |
| 2001 | → Shrewsbury Town (loan) | 0 | (0) |
| 2002–2003 | → Northampton Town (loan) | 10 | (0) |
| 2003–2005 | Northampton Town | 9 | (0) |
| 2005 | Chesterfield | 1 | (0) |
| 2005–2006 | Shrewsbury Town | 0 | (0) |
| 2006–2007 | Hereford United | 0 | (0) |
| 2007–2012 | Newport County | 136 | (0) |
| 2012–2013 | Worcester City | 27 | (0) |
| Total | | 200 | (0) |
- * Club domestic league appearances and goals

Glyn William Thompson (born 24 February 1981) is an English former association football goalkeeper.

== Career ==
Born in, Shropshire, Thompson began his career as a youth player with hometown club Shrewsbury Town. He made his senior début as a 19-year-old under manager Jake King, in a 3–0 away win over Torquay United on the last day of the 1998–99 Division Three season. He made one more appearance for the club in the League Cup against Sheffield United – before joining Fulham in October 1999.

Fulham sent him on loan to Mansfield Town January 2000. He made 16 appearances (with five clean sheets) before his loan spell ended in May of that year. Shrewsbury was again his next club, but he was only drafted in on loan as cover, and did not play.

He spent three months on loan to Northampton Town and made 10 league appearances. Northampton made the move permanent, but Thompson was only to start eight more league matches in the following two years. Chesterfield of League One bought him on a free transfer in March 2005.

A 1–1 draw with Swindon Town on the final day of the 2004–05 season was his only match for the Derbyshire club. Before the 2005–06 season began, Thompson rejoined The Shrews. He spent the whole season as second-choice goalkeeper behind Joe Hart and as a result opted to leave at the season's end, to find first-team action. On 29 June, he signed for Hereford United.

Shortly after his arrival at Edgar Street, he picked up an injury and so missed out on the opportunity to play when first choice goalkeeper Wayne Brown was injured in the first league game. When he recovered from his injury, loanee Scott Tynan was preferred as first choice goalkeeper until the return of Brown. Thompson made only one appearance for the first team in the 2006–07 season. This came in the Football League Trophy against his former club Shrewsbury, and he also appeared for the reserves and in the HFA Senior Cup.

In July 2007, he signed for Newport County then in the Conference South. Thompson was immediately a regular for Newport and in the 2009–10 season he was ever-present as Newport County were crowned Conference South champions with a record 103 points, 28 points ahead of second placed Dover Athletic. On 12 May 2012 Thompson played for Newport in the FA Trophy Final at Wembley Stadium which Newport lost 2–0 to York City.

In July 2012, Thompson was signed by Worcester City.
