= Darryl Knights =

English footballer

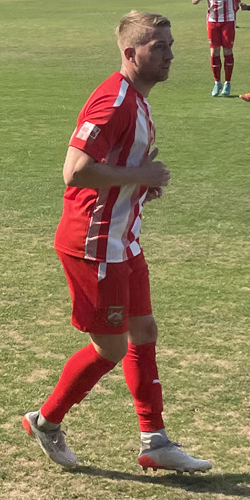
- Knights playing for Stourbridge in 2022

Personal information
- Full name: Darryl James Knights
- Date of birth: 1 May 1988 (age 38)
- Place of birth: Ipswich, England
- Height: 5 ft 7 in (1.70 m)
- Positions: Striker; winger

Team information
- Current team: Stourbridge (assistant manager)

Youth career
- Ipswich Town

Senior career*
Years	Team	Apps	(Gls)
2004–2007	Ipswich Town	1	(0)
2007	→ Yeovil Town (loan)	4	(0)
2007–2008	Yeovil Town	3	(0)
2007	→ Cambridge United (loan)	4	(0)
2008	→ Kidderminster Harriers (loan)	18	(4)
2008–2010	Kidderminster Harriers	78	(5)
2010–2012	Newport County	64	(8)
2012–2016	Solihull Moors	166	(30)
2016–2017	Kidderminster Harriers	15	(1)
2017–2018	Tamworth	41	(10)
2018–2020	AFC Telford United	58	(7)
2020–2024	Stourbridge	83	(6)
2024–2025	Stourport Swifts		

International career
2003–2004	England U16	4	(0)
2004–2005	England U17	7	(0)

Managerial career
- 2024: Stourbridge (interim)
- 2025: Stourbridge
- * Club domestic league appearances and goals as of 18:38, 16 June 2024 (UTC)

Darryl James Knights (born 1 May 1988) is an English football player and manager, who played as a striker. He is currently assistant manager of Southern League Premier Division Central club Stourbridge.

== Playing career ==
Born in Ipswich, Knights was a product of the youth system at Ipswich Town and played for England at youth and Under-17 level. He made his debut for the club as a 16-year-old in November 2004 but did not play for the first team again. After impressing Yeovil Town manager Russell Slade in training, Knights joined the League One side on loan in February 2007 for the remainder of the 2006–07 season. He made five substitute appearances for Yeovil, including one in the League One play-off final against Blackpool in May 2007. He then joined the club on a one-year contract in July 2007 after being given a free transfer by Ipswich at the end of the season.

Knights was unable to establish himself in the first team at Yeovil and joined Cambridge United on loan in October 2007. He returned to Yeovil in December 2007 He then joined Kidderminster Harriers on loan the following month for the rest of the 2007–08 season. After a successful loan spell at Kidderminster in which he scored four goals, he joined the club on a permanent basis in the summer of 2008.

In July 2010, Knights signed for Newport County. He subsequently scored the equaliser in the Welsh derby match between Newport and Wrexham in September 2010. On 12 May 2012, he played for Newport in the FA Trophy Final at Wembley Stadium which Newport lost 2–0 to York City, coming on as a second-half substitute. Knights was released by Newport the following week at the end of his contract.

Knights joined Conference North side Solihull Moors on 1 August 2012 following his release from Newport. On 6 December 2016, Knights rejoined Kidderminster Harriers after leaving Solihull Moors. He remained at the club until the end of the season, making 15 appearances and scoring one goal, before being released. Knights became the first signing of the 2017–18 season for National League North side Tamworth when he joined on 17 May 2017.

In June 2024, Knights joined Midland League Premier Division side Stourport Swifts. In December 2025, Knights stepped back to become assistant manager, following the appointment of Scott Adey-Linforth as manager.

== Career statistics ==
As of match played 1 January 2024

Appearances and goals by club, season and competition
Club	Season	League			FA Cup		League Cup		Other		Total	
Club	Season	Division	Apps	Goals	Apps	Goals	Apps	Goals	Apps	Goals	Apps	Goals
Ipswich Town	2004–05	Championship	1	0	0	0	0	0	0	0	1	0
Ipswich Town	2005–06	Championship	0	0	0	0	0	0	—		0	0
Ipswich Town	2006–07	Championship	0	0	0	0	0	0	—		0	0
Ipswich Town	Total		1	0	0	0	0	0	0	0	1	0
Yeovil Town (loan)	2006–07	League One	4	0	0	0	0	0	1 (Note: Appearance in League One play-offs)	0	5	0
Yeovil Town	2007–08	League One	3	0	0	0	0	0	1 (Note: Appearance in Football League Trophy)	0	4	0
Cambridge United (loan)	2007–08	Conference Premier	4	0	2	0	—		0	0	6	0
Kidderminster Harriers (loan)	2007–08	Conference Premier	18	4	—		—		1 (Note: Appearance(s) in FA Trophy)	0	19	4
Kidderminster Harriers	2008–09	Conference Premier	36	1	2	0	—		1	0	39	1
Kidderminster Harriers	2009–10	Conference Premier	42	4	2	0	—		5	1	49	5
Kidderminster Harriers	Total		78	5	4	0	—		6	1	88	6
Newport County	2010–11	Conference Premier	41	7	1	0	—		3	0	45	7
Newport County	2011–12	Conference Premier	23	1	2	0	—		7	2	32	3
Newport County	Total		64	8	3	0	—		10	2	77	10
Solihull Moors	2012–13	Conference North	37	4	0	0	—		2	0	39	4
Solihull Moors	2013–14	Conference North	33	3	0	0	—		0	0	33	3
Solihull Moors	2014–15	Conference North	39	12	0	0	—		1	0	40	12
Solihull Moors	2015–16	National League North	37	11	0	0	—		1	0	38	11
Solihull Moors	2016–17	National League	20	0	3	0	—		0	0	23	0
Solihull Moors	Total		166	30	3	0	—		4	0	173	30
Kidderminster Harriers	2016–17	National League North	15	1	—		—		3	0	18	1
Tamworth	2017–18	National League North	41	10	0	0	—		0	0	41	10
AFC Telford United	2018–19	National League North	39	5	2	0	—		5	0	46	5
AFC Telford United	2019–20	National League North	19	2	1	0	—		1	0	21	2
AFC Telford United	Total		58	7	3	0	—		6	0	67	7
Stourbridge	2020–21	Southern League; Premier Division Central	8	1	1	1	—		1	0	10	2
Stourbridge	2021–22	Southern League; Premier Division Central	36	4	1	0	—		11 (Note: Six appearances in FA Trophy, five appearances in Birmingham Senior Cup)	0	48	4
Stourbridge	2022–23	Southern League; Premier Division Central	32	1	2	0	—		7 (Note: Two appearances in FA Trophy, five appearances in Birmingham Senior Cup)	0	41	1
Stourbridge	2023–24	Southern League; Premier Division Central	7	0	4	0	—		4 (Note: Three appearances and one goal in FA Trophy, one appearance in Birmingham Senior Cup)	1	15	1
Stourbridge	Total		83	6	8	1	—		23	1	114	8
Career total			535	71	23	1	0	0	55	4	613	76

== Honours ==
Ipswich Town

- FA Youth Cup: 2004–05

Solihull Moors

- Birmingham Senior Cup: 2015–16
