= 2011–12 FA Trophy =

FA Challenge Trophy

Tournament details
- Country: England; Wales
- Teams: 266

Final positions
- Champions: York City
- Runners-up: Newport County

The 2011–12 FA Trophy is the 42nd season of the FA Trophy, the Football Association's cup competition for teams at levels 5–8 of the English football league system. A total of 266 clubs entered the competition.

The competition was won for the first time by York City, who defeated Newport County 2–0 in the Final at Wembley on 12 May 2012. Newport County became the second Welsh club to reach an FA Trophy final, after Bangor City in 1984.

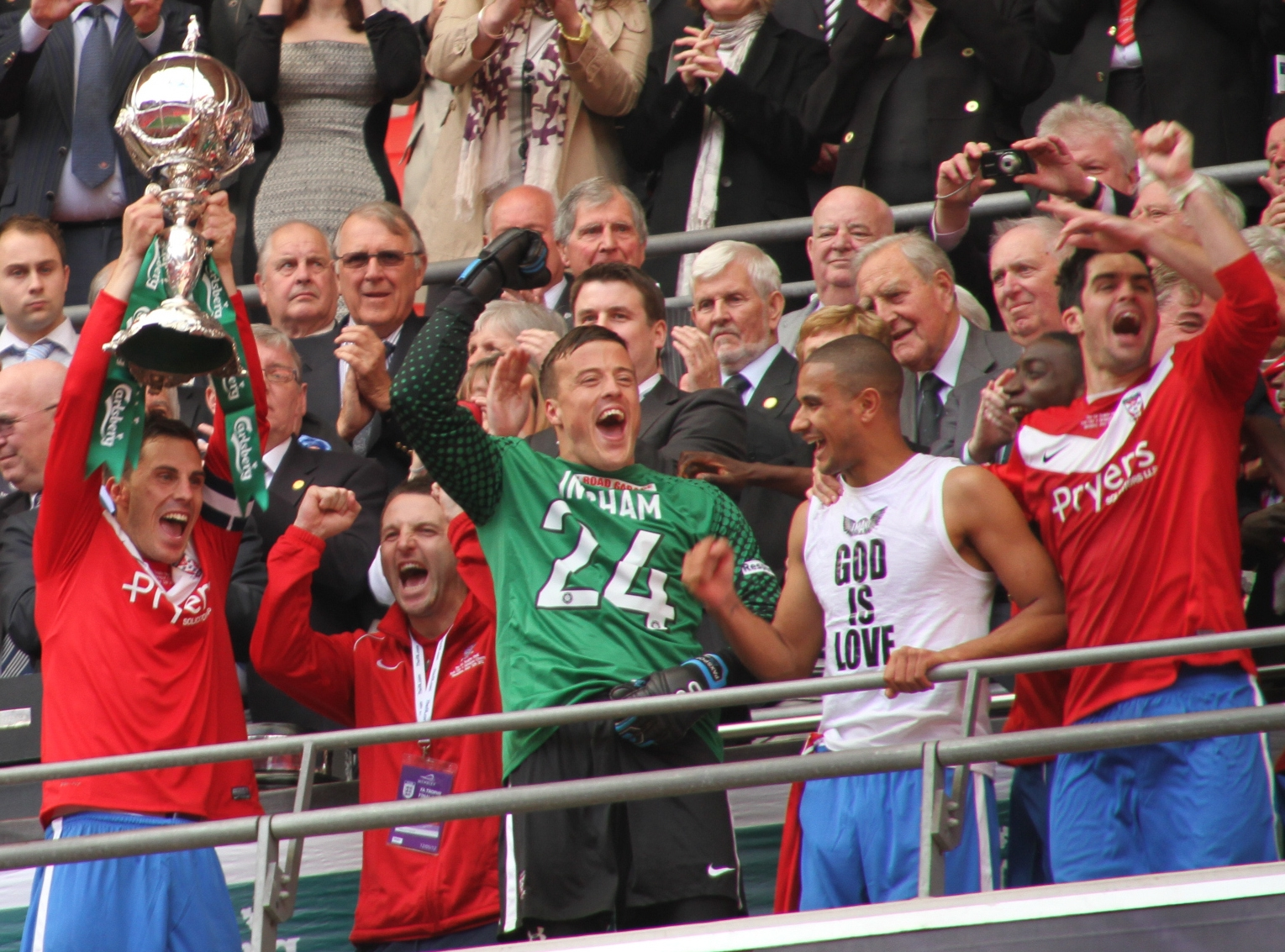
2012 FA Trophy Final York City Captain, Chris Smith, lifting trophy

== Calendar ==
| Round | Date | Matches | Clubs | New entries this round | Prize money |
|---|---|---|---|---|---|
| Preliminary round | 8 October 2011 | 54 | 266→212 | 108 | £2,000 |
| First round qualifying | 22 October 2011 | 72 | 212→140 | 90 | £2,200 |
| Second round qualifying | 5 November 2011 | 36 | 140→104 | none | £3,000 |
| Third round qualifying | 26 November 2011 | 40 | 104→64 | 44 | £4,000 |
| First round | 10 December 2011 | 32 | 64→32 | 24 | £5,000 |
| Second round | 14 January 2012 | 16 | 32→16 | none | £6,000 |
| Third round | 4 February 2012 | 8 | 16→8 | none | £7,000 |
| Quarter-finals | 25 February 2012 | 4 | 8→4 | none | £8,000 |
| Semi-finals | 10 and 17 March 2012 | 2 | 4→2 | none | £16,000 |
| Final | 12 May 2012 | 1 | 2→1 | none | £50,000 (winners), £25,000 (runners up) |

== Preliminary round ==
Ties will be played on 8 October 2011.

=== Ties ===
| Tie | Home team | Score | Away team | Attendance |
|---|---|---|---|---|
| 1 | Garforth Town | 5–1 | Lancaster City | 92 |
| 2 | Trafford | 1–4 | AFC Fylde | 134 |
| 3 | Prescot Cables | 1–2 | Durham City | 132 |
| 4 | Cammell Laird | 0–3 | Bamber Bridge | 45 |
| 5 | Ossett Albion | 1–3 | Lincoln United | 82 |
| 6 | Salford City | 2–2 | Clitheroe | 101 |
| 7 | Ossett Town | 2–1 | Wakefield | 99 |
| 8 | Brigg Town | 2–1 | Mossley | 96 |
| 9 | Woodley Sports | 4–3 | Skelmersdale United | 62 |
| 10 | New Mills | 2–3 | Radcliffe Borough | 151 |
| 11 | Sheffield | 2–2 | Warrington Town | 213 |
| 12 | Kidsgrove Athletic | 2–1 | Loughborough Dynamo | 154 |
| 13 | Barton Rovers | 2–1 | Shepshed Dynamo | 85 |
| 14 | Rainworth Miners Welfare | 1–2 | Hucknall Town | 124 |
| 15 | Carlton Town | 4–5 | Belper Town | 100 |
| 16 | Newcastle Town | 1–0 | Woodford United | 89 |
| 17 | Stamford | 5–4 | Coalville Town | 279 |
| 18 | Quorn | 0–5 | Biggleswade Town | 132 |
| 19 | Bedworth United | 2–1 | Market Drayton Town | 150 |
| 20 | Rugby Town | 1–1 | Sutton Coldfield Town | 210 |
| 21 | Halesowen Town | 0–1 | Romulus | 277 |
| 22 | Stourport Swifts | 1–1 | Daventry Town | 68 |
| 23 | Bedfont Town | 4–1 | Romford | 82 |
| 24 | Waltham Abbey | 1–1 | Grays Athletic | 171 |
| 25 | Ilford | 2–3 | Redbridge | 88 |
| 26 | Ashford Town (Middlesex) | 3–1 | Maidstone United | 102 |
| 27 | Thamesmead Town | 3–2 | Whitstable Town | 53 |
| 28 | Whyteleafe | 4–3 | North Greenford United | 84 |
| 29 | Ramsgate | 2–7 | Needham Market | 160 |
| 30 | Burgess Hill Town | 3–0 | Corinthian-Casuals | 142 |
| 31 | Potters Bar Town | 1–0 | Heybridge Swifts | 127 |
| 32 | Soham Town Rangers | 1–7 | Whitehawk | 140 |
| 33 | Brentwood Town | 1–0 | Leiston | 171 |
| 34 | Ware | 0–1 | Chipstead | 85 |
| 35 | Sittingbourne | 1–1 | Northwood | 109 |
| 36 | Waltham Forest | 2–1 | Tilbury | 84 |
| 37 | AFC Hayes | 2–1 | Cheshunt | 51 |
| 38 | Eastbourne Town | 4–3 | Chatham Town | 127 |
| 39 | Walton Casuals | 2–2 | Faversham Town | 72 |
| 40 | AFC Sudbury | 6–1 | Great Wakering Rovers | 198 |
| 41 | Walton & Hersham | 1–2 | Enfield Town | 135 |
| 42 | Bideford | 2–0 | Beaconsfield SYCOB | 171 |
| 43 | Bognor Regis Town | 0–1 | Mangotsfield United | 344 |
| 44 | Didcot Town | 3–1 | Clevedon Town | 122 |
| 45 | Yate Town | 2–1 | Hungerford Town | 105 |
| 46 | Worthing | 3–3 | Crawley Down | 264 |
| 47 | Bridgwater Town | 1–3 | Tiverton Town | 197 |
| 48 | Thatcham Town | 2–0 | North Leigh | 100 |
| 49 | Chalfont St Peter | 4–3 | Abingdon United | 87 |
| 50 | Cinderford Town | 0–3 | Poole Town | 105 |
| 51 | Gosport Borough | 3–0 | Slough Town | 175 |
| 52 | Fleet Town | 0–0 | Burnham | 89 |
| 53 | Wimborne Town | 0–2 | Sholing | 186 |
| 54 | Bishop's Cleeve | 0–1 | Paulton Rovers | 75 |

=== Replays ===
| Tie | Home team | Score | Away team | Attendance |
|---|---|---|---|---|
| 6 | Clitheroe | 1–2 † | Salford City | 156 |
| 11 | Warrington Town | 2–3 | Sheffield | 105 |
| 20 | Sutton Coldfield Town | 4–0 | Rugby Town | 91 |
| 22 | Daventry Town | 3–1 | Stourport Swifts | 113 |
| 24 | Grays Athletic | 4–0 | Waltham Abbey | 174 |
| 35 | Northwood | 3–4 † | Sittingbourne | 109 |
| 39 | Faversham Town | 5–3 | Walton Casuals | 91 |
| 46 | Crawley Down | 0–2 | Worthing | 113 |
| 52 | Burnham | 0–1 | Fleet Town | 81 |

† – After extra time

== First round qualifying ==
Ties will be played on 22 October 2011

Teams from Premier Division of Southern League, Northern Premier League and Isthmian League entered in this round.

=== Ties ===
| Tie | Home team | Score | Away team | Attendance |
|---|---|---|---|---|
| 1 | Chester | 2–1 | Ashton United | 1,624 |
| 2 | Goole | 2–3 | Durham City | 132 |
| 3 | Bradford Park Avenue | 1–1 | Worksop Town | 269 |
| 4 | Marine | 1–0 | Chorley | 279 |
| 5 | Witton Albion | 6–1 | Brigg Town | 209 |
| 6 | Radcliffe Borough | 2–1 | Harrogate Railway Athletic | 112 |
| 7 | Farsley | 2–2 | Curzon Ashton | 217 |
| 8 | Buxton | 4–2 | Garforth Town | 188 |
| 9 | Frickley Athletic | 0–4 | F.C. United of Manchester | 524 |
| 10 | Northwich Victoria | 4–2 | AFC Fylde | 380 |
| 11 | Sheffield | 3–0 | Bamber Bridge | 249 |
| 12 | Kendal Town | 1–0 | Nantwich Town | 192 |
| 13 | Woodley Sports | 3–1 | Whitby Town | 63 |
| 14 | North Ferriby United | 3–1 | Lincoln United | 122 |
| 15 | Burscough | 0–1 | Salford City | 118 |
| 16 | Stocksbridge Park Steels | 2–2 | Ossett Town | 291 |
| 17 | St Neots Town | 3–1 | Sutton Coldfield Town | 311 |
| 18 | Chasetown | 5–0 | Grantham Town | 241 |
| 19 | Leek Town | 4–1 | Hucknall Town | 223 |
| 20 | Ilkeston | 2–0 | Biggleswade Town | 444 |
| 21 | Leighton Town | 0–1 | Banbury United | 137 |
| 22 | Rushall Olympic | 0–2 | Cambridge City | 153 |
| 23 | Evesham United | 2–2 | Barwell | 107 |
| 24 | Daventry Town | 4–3 | Kidsgrove Athletic | 126 |
| 25 | Brackley Town | 1–0 | Mickleover Sports | 167 |
| 26 | Romulus | 1–0 | Leamington | 154 |
| 27 | Barton Rovers | 0–1 | Belper Town | 106 |
| 28 | Matlock Town | 3–0 | Stamford | 299 |
| 29 | Bedworth United | 0–1 | Hednesford Town | 192 |
| 30 | Newcastle Town | 1–1 | Stafford Rangers | 505 |
| 31 | Stourbridge | 2–1 | Redditch United | 291 |
| 32 | Arlesey Town | 3–1 | AFC Sudbury | 185 |
| 33 | Whyteleafe | 0–3 | Grays Athletic | 145 |
| 34 | Brentwood Town | 2–3 | Lowestoft Town | 197 |
| 35 | Potters Bar Town | 1–0 | AFC Hayes | 95 |
| 36 | Lewes | 2–1 | Cray Wanderers | 536 |
| 37 | Dulwich Hamlet | 0–2 | Harrow Borough | 294 |
| 38 | Chipstead | 1–3 | Margate | 120 |
| 39 | Folkestone Invicta | 1–0 | Metropolitan Police | 202 |
| 40 | Aveley | 0–1 | Bury Town | 102 |
| 41 | St Albans City | 1–3 | Ashford Town (Middlesex) | 275 |
| 42 | Canvey Island | 4–0 | Hendon | 262 |
| 43 | Eastbourne Town | 1–3 | Hitchin Town | 181 |
| 44 | Merstham | 0–4 | Maldon & Tiptree | 75 |
| 45 | Billericay Town | 1–0 | Whitehawk | 272 |
| 46 | Uxbridge | 3–1 | Sittingbourne | 99 |
| 47 | Redbridge | 3–1 | Needham Market | 92 |
| 48 | Concord Rangers | 2–3 | Harlow Town | 109 |
| 49 | Hemel Hempstead Town | 1–1 | Croydon Athletic | 214 |
| 50 | Hythe Town | 1–0 | Burgess Hill Town | 201 |
| 51 | Wealdstone | 3–0 | Tooting & Mitcham United | 233 |
| 52 | Bedfont Town | 1–1 | Hastings United | 79 |
| 53 | East Thurrock United | 1–1 | Bedford Town | 141 |
| 54 | Waltham Forest | 0–1 | Faversham Town | 36 |
| 55 | Thamesmead Town | 2–0 | Enfield Town | 84 |
| 56 | Wingate & Finchley | 1–2 | AFC Hornchurch | 152 |
| 57 | Kingstonian | 0–1 | Godalming Town | 258 |
| 58 | Marlow | 1–1 | Didcot Town | 148 |
| 59 | Andover | w/o | Swindon Supermarine | N/A |
Walkover for Swindon Supermarine – Andover folded
| 60 | Cirencester Town | 3–1 | Leatherhead | 116 |
| 61 | Chertsey Town | 2–0 | Chalfont St Peter | 167 |
| 62 | Gosport Borough | 1–0 | Sholing | 174 |
| 63 | Taunton Town | 0–3 | Paulton Rovers | 203 |
| 64 | Carshalton Athletic | 3–1 | Bideford | 200 |
| 65 | Chesham United | 5–0 | Horsham | 303 |
| 66 | Oxford City | 0–3 | Mangotsfield United | 196 |
| 67 | Fleet Town | 0–5 | Yate Town | 88 |
| 68 | Weymouth | 3–2 | AFC Totton | 512 |
| 69 | Poole Town | 1–1 | Chippenham Town | 316 |
| 70 | Bashley | 2–2 | Worthing | 184 |
| 71 | Aylesbury | 0–0 | Tiverton Town | 111 |
| 72 | Frome Town | 0–1 | Thatcham Town | 199 |

=== Replays ===
| Tie | Home team | Score | Away team | Attendance |
|---|---|---|---|---|
| 3 | Worksop Town | 4–1 | Bradford Park Avenue | 281 |
| 7 | Curzon Ashton | 2–0 | Farsley | 128 |
| 16 | Ossett Town | 3–2 | Stocksbridge Park Steels | 71 |
| 23 | Barwell | 5–1 | Evesham United | 104 |
| 30 | Stafford Rangers | 5–2 | Newcastle Town | 374 |
| 49 | Croydon Athletic | 0–2 | Hemel Hempstead Town | 96 |
| 52 | Hastings United | 0–2 | Bedfont Town | 160 |
| 53 | Bedford Town | 1–2 | East Thurrock United | 189 |
| 58 | Didcot Town | 4–0 | Marlow | 104 |
| 69 | Chippenham Town | 2–1 | Poole Town | 244 |
| 70 | Worthing | 4–2 † | Bashley | 153 |
| 71 | Tiverton Town | 2–1 | Aylesbury | 171 |

† – After extra time

== Second round qualifying ==
Ties will be played on 5 November 2011

=== Ties ===
| Tie | Home team | Score | Away team | Attendance |
|---|---|---|---|---|
| 1 | Chester | 2–0 | Stafford Rangers | 1,551 |
| 2 | Northwich Victoria | 3–0 | Buxton | 421 |
| 3 | Hednesford Town | 0–0 | Matlock Town | 391 |
| 4 | Stourbridge | 3–3 | Kendal Town | 338 |
| 5 | Radcliffe Borough | 1–1 | Worksop Town | 143 |
| 6 | North Ferriby United | 3–0 | Salford City | 135 |
| 7 | Curzon Ashton | 2–1 | Belper Town | 137 |
| 8 | Marine | 5–2 | Chasetown | 213 |
| 9 | Ossett Town | 4–2 | Barwell | 71 |
| 10 | Sheffield | 2–0 | Romulus | 231 |
| 11 | Ilkeston | 2–1 | Woodley Sports | 455 |
| 12 | Durham City | 1–1 | F.C. United of Manchester | 533 |
| 13 | Leek Town | 3–3 | Witton Albion | 443 |
| 14 | Folkestone Invicta | 4–2 | Daventry Town | 266 |
| 15 | Grays Athletic | 2–3 | Canvey Island | 344 |
| 16 | Faversham Town | 2–4 | East Thurrock United | 137 |
| 17 | Margate | 1–1 | Wealdstone | 304 |
| 18 | Harrow Borough | 1–1 | AFC Hornchurch | 123 |
| 19 | Maldon & Tiptree | 3–2 | Bedfont Town | 38 |
| 20 | Harlow Town | 3–2 | Lewes | 183 |
| 21 | Bury Town | 3–2 | Hythe Town | 302 |
| 22 | Uxbridge | 5–2 | Potters Bar Town | 124 |
| 23 | Cambridge City | 1–2 | Redbridge | 291 |
| 24 | Hitchin Town | 1–3 | Lowestoft Town | 282 |
| 25 | Billericay Town | 2–0 | St Neots Town | 315 |
| 26 | Thamesmead Town | 3–0 | Arlesey Town | 32 |
| 27 | Hemel Hempstead Town | 2–3 | Brackley Town | 210 |
| 28 | Banbury United | 3–1 | Paulton Rovers | 207 |
| 29 | Carshalton Athletic | 3–1 | Cirencester Town | 225 |
| 30 | Worthing | 0–2 | Didcot Town | 263 |
| 31 | Chesham United | 2–2 | Tiverton Town | 323 |
| 32 | Gosport Borough | 4–0 | Godalming Town | 170 |
| 33 | Chippenham Town | 1–1 | Mangotsfield United | 361 |
| 34 | Chertsey Town | 6–5 | Ashford Town (Middlesex) | 170 |
| 35 | Thatcham Town | 1–1 | Weymouth | 249 |
| 36 | Yate Town | 0–1 | Swindon Supermarine | 136 |

=== Replays ===
| Tie | Home team | Score | Away team | Attendance |
|---|---|---|---|---|
| 3 | Matlock Town | 2–1 | Hednesford Town | 279 |
| 4 | Kendal Town | 0–6 | Stourbridge | 207 |
| 5 | Worksop Town | 2–0 | Radcliffe Borough | 261 |
| 12 | F.C. United of Manchester | 3–1 † | Durham City | 672 |
| 13 | Witton Albion | 4–1 | Leek Town | 272 |
| 17 | Wealdstone | 2–1 | Margate | 228 |
| 18 | AFC Hornchurch | 1–0 | Harrow Borough | 176 |
| 31 | Tiverton Town | 1–0 | Chesham United | 208 |
| 33 | Mangotsfield United | 0–2 | Chippenham Town | 250 |
| 35 | Weymouth | 6–1 | Thatcham Town | 367 |

† – After extra time

== Third round qualifying ==
Ties will be played on 26 November 2011. This round is the first in which Conference North and South teams join the competition.

=== Ties ===
| Tie | Home team | Score | Away team | Attendance |
|---|---|---|---|---|
| 1 | Corby Town | 1–1 | North Ferriby United | 519 |
| 2 | Blyth Spartans | 1–3 | Stalybridge Celtic | 324 |
| 3 | Boston United | 1–0 | Workington | 743 |
| 4 | Sheffield | 0–4 | Nuneaton Town | 426 |
| 5 | Gainsborough Trinity | 0–1 | Hinckley United | 320 |
| 6 | Worcester City | 0–1 | Harrogate Town | 676 |
| 7 | Colwyn Bay | 0–0 | FC Halifax Town | 420 |
| 8 | Worksop Town | 3–2 | Curzon Ashton | 238 |
| 9 | Guiseley | 7–0 | Eastwood Town | 323 |
| 10 | Stourbridge | 0–2 | Chester | 1,481 |
| 11 | Matlock Town | 0–1 | Hyde | 367 |
| 12 | Solihull Moors | 2–2 | Ossett Town | 152 |
| 13 | Droylsden | 2–1 | Witton Albion | 304 |
| 14 | F.C. United of Manchester | 2–1 | Altrincham | 1,945 |
| 15 | Northwich Victoria | 1–1 | Ilkeston | 437 |
| 16 | Vauxhall Motors | 3–2 | Marine | 329 |
| 17 | Farnborough | 2–2 | Bury Town | 312 |
| 18 | Maldon & Tiptree | 0–1 | Carshalton Athletic | 72 |
| 19 | Sutton United | 1–2 | Basingstoke Town | 460 |
| 20 | Banbury United | 0–0 | Wealdstone | 370 |
| 21 | Bishop's Stortford | 1–1 | Tonbridge Angels | 297 |
| 22 | Thamesmead Town | 2–2 | Welling United | 273 |
| 23 | Chelmsford City | 2–0 | Woking | 740 |
| 24 | Bromley | 1–3 | Didcot Town | 277 |
| 25 | Folkestone Invicta | 1–3 | Staines Town | 342 |
| 26 | Redbridge | 1–2 | East Thurrock United | 108 |
| 27 | Eastbourne Borough | 0–0 | Dartford | 508 |
| 28 | Thurrock | 0–5 | AFC Hornchurch | 211 |
| 29 | Uxbridge | 2–1 | Histon | 150 |
| 30 | Harlow Town | 1–2 | Lowestoft Town | 343 |
| 31 | Hampton and Richmond Borough | 4–2 | Canvey Island | 289 |
| 32 | Brackley Town | 2–0 | Chertsey Town | 136 |
| 33 | Maidenhead United | 1–0 | Billericay Town | 235 |
| 34 | Boreham Wood | 1–0 | Dover Athletic | 181 |
| 35 | Tiverton Town | 0–1 | Swindon Supermarine | 277 |
| 36 | Gloucester City | 1–1 | Truro City | 300 |
| 37 | Salisbury City | 2–0 | Weston-super-Mare | 552 |
| 38 | Dorchester Town | 1–2 | Gosport Borough | 381 |
| 39 | Chippenham Town | 1–1 | Eastleigh | 421 |
| 40 | Weymouth | 0–0 | Havant & Waterlooville | 421 |

=== Replays ===
| Tie | Home team | Score | Away team | Attendance |
|---|---|---|---|---|
| 1 | North Ferriby United | 3–2 | Corby Town | 170 |
| 7 | FC Halifax Town | 1–2 | Colwyn Bay | 717 |
| 12 | Ossett Town | 0–1 | Solihull Moors | 137 |
| 15 | Ilkeston | 1–5 | Northwich Victoria | 530 |
| 17 | Bury Town | 0–2 † | Farnborough | 255 |
| 20 | Wealdstone | 4–0 | Banbury United | 222 |
| 21 | Tonbridge Angels | 1–2 | Bishop's Stortford | 274 |
| 22 | Welling United | 3–1 | Thamesmead Town | 288 |
| 27 | Dartford | 2–1 | Eastbourne Borough | 611 |
| 36 | Truro City | 3–2 | Gloucester City | 281 |
| 39 | Eastleigh | 1–1 † | Chippenham Town | 214 |
Chippenham Town advance 8–7 on penalties
| 40 | Havant & Waterlooville | 0–2 | Weymouth | 238 |

† – After extra time

== First round ==
Ties will be played on 10 December 2011. This round is the first in which Conference Premier teams join those from lower reaches of the National League System.

=== Ties ===
| Tie | Home team | Score | Away team | Attendance |
|---|---|---|---|---|
| 1 | Northwich Victoria | 3–1 | Fleetwood Town | 484 |
| 2 | Colwyn Bay | 1–3 | Lincoln City | 383 |
| 3 | Vauxhall Motors | 4–4 | Kidderminster Harriers | 253 |
| 4 | Stockport County | 2–2 | Stalybridge Celtic | 1,690 |
| 5 | York City | 2–2 | Solihull Moors | 1,116 |
| 6 | Barrow | 3–2 | Harrogate Town | 868 |
| 7 | Nuneaton Town | 0–2 | AFC Telford United | 945 |
| 8 | Guiseley | 2–0 | F.C. United of Manchester | 810 |
| 9 | Wrexham | 1–2 | Hinckley United | 1,101 |
| 10 | Droylsden | 2–1 | Mansfield Town | 335 |
| 11 | Grimsby Town | 3–0 | Darlington | 1,527 |
| 12 | Gateshead | 3–2 | Kettering Town | 402 |
| 13 | Worksop Town | 1–0 | Tamworth | 343 |
| 14 | North Ferriby United | 1–5 | Chester | 510 |
| 15 | Alfreton Town | 4–0 | Southport | 394 |
| 16 | Boston United | 2–1 | Hyde | 710 |
| 17 | Salisbury City | 4–1 | Lowestoft Town | 494 |
| 18 | Luton Town | 2–0 | Swindon Supermarine | 1,298 |
| 19 | Didcot Town | 0–1 | Basingstoke Town | 259 |
| 20 | Chelmsford City | 2–3 | Bath City | 635 |
| 21 | Wealdstone | 5–0 | Uxbridge | 373 |
| 22 | Truro City | 2–5 | Ebbsfleet United | 455 |
| 23 | Hampton and Richmond Borough | 2–0 | Hayes & Yeading United | 242 |
| 24 | Carshalton Athletic | 5–0 | Bishop's Stortford | 243 |
| 25 | East Thurrock United | 2–1 | Welling United | 224 |
| 26 | Staines Town | 0–0 | Maidenhead United | 201 |
| 27 | Weymouth | 2–1 | Chippenham Town | 568 |
| 28 | Boreham Wood | 0–1 | Cambridge United | 401 |
| 29 | Brackley Town | 0–3 | Dartford | 291 |
| 30 | AFC Hornchurch | 0–0 | Farnborough | 302 |
| 31 | Newport County | 0–0 | Forest Green Rovers | 724 |
| 32 | Gosport Borough | 0–1 | Braintree Town | 332 |

=== Replays ===
| Tie | Home team | Score | Away team | Attendance |
|---|---|---|---|---|
| 3 | Kidderminster Harriers | 2–0 | Vauxhall Motors | 746 |
| 4 | Stalybridge Celtic | 2–1 | Stockport County | 1,149 |
| 5 | Solihull Moors | 0–3 | York City | 275 |
| 26 | Maidenhead United | 1–2 | Staines Town | 154 |
| 30 | Farnborough | 2–3 | AFC Hornchurch | 204 |
| 31 | Forest Green Rovers | 0–2 | Newport County | 368 |

== Second round ==
Ties will be played on 14 January 2012.

=== Ties ===
| Tie | Home team | Score | Away team | Attendance |
|---|---|---|---|---|
| 1 | Ebbsfleet United | 3–2 | Chester | 1,387 |
| 2 | Wealdstone | 2–1 | Barrow | 722 |
| 3 | Weymouth | 0–6 | Alfreton Town | 739 |
| 4 | Worksop Town | 1–3 | Newport County | 538 |
| 5 | Gateshead | 2–2 | Braintree Town | 605 |
| 6 | Lincoln City | 0–0 | Carshalton Athletic | 1,743 |
| 7 | Kidderminster Harriers | 5–1 | Droylsden | 1,104 |
| 8 | Dartford | 4–2 | Boston United | 1,166 |
| 9 | East Thurrock United | 1–1 | Hampton & Richmond Borough | 231 |
| 10 | Grimsby Town | 4–0 | AFC Hornchurch | 2,415 |
| 11 | Cambridge United | 4–1 | AFC Telford United | 1,259 |
| 12 | Northwich Victoria | 1–0 | Staines Town | 517 |
| 13 | Hinckley United | 0–0 | Luton Town | 754 |
| 14 | Salisbury City | 2–6 | York City | 827 |
| 15 | Guiseley | 2–0 | Stalybridge Celtic | 630 |
| 16 | Bath City | 1–0 | Basingstoke Town | 633 |

=== Replays ===
| Tie | Home team | Score | Away team | Attendance |
|---|---|---|---|---|
| 5 | Braintree Town | 1–1 † | Gateshead | 261 |
Gateshead advance 4–3 on penalties
| 6 | Carshalton Athletic | 3–1 | Lincoln City | 488 |
| 9 | Hampton & Richmond Borough | 4–1 | East Thurrock United | 184 |
| 13 | Luton Town | 3–0 | Hinckley United | 1,004 |

† – After extra time

== Third round ==
Ties will be played on 4 February 2012.

=== Ties ===
| Tie | Home team | Score | Away team | Attendance |
|---|---|---|---|---|
| 1 | Kidderminster Harriers | 1–2 | Luton Town | 1,186 |
| 2 | Northwich Victoria | 4–1 | Hampton & Richmond Borough | 237 |
| 3 | Cambridge United | 1–0 | Guiseley | 1,118 |
| 4 | Dartford | 2–2 | Wealdstone | 770 |
| 5 | Bath City | 1–2 | Grimsby Town | 546 |
| 6 | York City | 1–0 | Ebbsfleet United | 1,419 |
| 7 | Gateshead | 2–1 | Alfreton Town | 347 |
| 8 | Newport County | 4–0 | Carshalton Athletic | 975 |

=== Replay ===
| Tie | Home team | Score | Away team | Attendance |
|---|---|---|---|---|
| 4 | Wealdstone | 1–0 | Dartford | 670 |

== Quarter-finals ==
Ties will be played on 25 February 2012.

=== Ties ===
| Tie | Home team | Score | Away team | Attendance |
|---|---|---|---|---|
| 1 | Cambridge United | 1–2 | Wealdstone | 2,034 |
| 2 | Luton Town | 2–0 | Gateshead | 2,499 |
| 3 | Grimsby Town | 0–1 | York City | 3,662 |
| 4 | Northwich Victoria | 2–3 | Newport County | 601 |

== Semi-finals ==
=== First leg ===
10 March 2012
15:00 (GMT)

| Newport County | 3–1 | Wealdstone |
|---|---|---|
| Buchanan 6'; Jarvis 24'; Knights 79' | | Jolly 49' |

Newport Stadium
Attendance: 2,209
Referee: Oliver Langford
10 March 2012
15:00 (GMT)

| York City | 1–0 | Luton Town |
|---|---|---|
| Reed 14' (pen.) |

Bootham Crescent
Attendance: 3,365
Referee: Paul Tierney

=== Second leg ===
17 March 2012
15:00 (GMT)

| Wealdstone | 0–0 | Newport County |

Grosvenor Vale
Attendance: 2,092
Referee: James Linington

Newport County win 3–1 on aggregate

17 March 2012
15:00 (GMT)

| Luton Town | 1–1 | York City |
|---|---|---|
| Willmott 43' | | Blair 90' |

Kenilworth Road
Attendance: 5,796
Referee: Andy Woolmer

York City win 2–1 on aggregate

== Final ==
12 May 2012
15:00 (GMT)

| Newport County | 0–2 | York City |
|---|---|---|
| | | Blair 65'; Oyebanjo 72' |

Wembley Stadium, London
Attendance: 19,844
Referee: Anthony Taylor
