= 2015–16 Fleetwood Town F.C. season =

Fleetwood Town F.C.
2015–16 season
- Chairman: Andrew Pilley
- Manager: Graham Alexander (till 30 September); Chris Lucketti (30 September – 6 October); Steven Pressley (from 6 October)
- Stadium: Highbury Stadium
- League One: 19th
- FA Cup: 1st round (knocked out by Walsall)
- League Cup: 1st round (knocked out by Hartlepool United)
- JP Trophy: Semifinal
- Top goalscorer: League: Bobby Grant (9); All: Bobby Grant (10)
- Highest home attendance: 5,123 vs. Blackpool
- Lowest home attendance: 2,134 vs. Peterborough United
Home colours	Away colours

The 2015–16 season was Fleetwood Town's 108th season in their history and second consecutive season in League One. Along with League One, the club also competed in the FA Cup, League Cup and JP Trophy. The season covered the period from 1 July 2015 to 30 June 2016, with competitive matches played between August and May.

== Squad ==
As of 18 March 2016

Note: Flags indicate national team as defined under FIFA eligibility rules; some limited exceptions apply. Players may hold more than one non-FIFA nationality.

No.	Pos.	Nation	Player
1	GK	WAL	Chris Maxwell
2	DF	NIR	Conor McLaughlin
3	DF	ENG	Danny Andrew
4	DF	ENG	Stephen Jordan
5	MF	ISL	Eggert Jónsson
6	DF	ENG	Nathan Pond (captain)
7	DF	ENG	Amari'i Bell
8	MF	IRL	Jimmy Ryan
9	FW	NGR	Shola Ameobi
11	FW	WAL	Wes Burns (loan from Bristol City)
12	MF	ENG	Tyler Hornby-Forbes
14	FW	ENG	Bobby Grant
15	DF	FRA	Victor Nirennold
16	MF	ENG	Akil Wright
18	MF	ENG	Antoni Sarcevic (vice-captain)
19	FW	FRA	Vamara Sanogo
20	MF	ENG	Keano Deacon
22	FW	ENG	Ashley Hunter

No.	Pos.	Nation	Player
23	FW	ENG	David Ball
24	MF	ENG	Conor Smith
27	MF	ENG	Nick Haughton
28	FW	ENG	Jack Sowerby
30	DF	SCO	Bob Harris (on loan from Sheffield United)
31	DF	SWE	Marcus Nilsson
32	DF	ENG	Matty Williams
33	DF	ENG	Keir Dickson
34	MF	ENG	Kieran Dunbar
35	DF	ENG	Bradley Roscoe
37	MF	SCO	Stefan Scougall (on loan from Sheffield United)
40	GK	USA	Aleksandar Gogić
41	GK	ENG	Andreas Arestidou
42	DF	SCO	Thomas Grant
44	FW	ENG	Devante Cole
45	FW	BEL	David Henen (on loan from Everton)
47	DF	ENG	Joe Davis

=== Out on loan ===
Note: Flags indicate national team as defined under FIFA eligibility rules; some limited exceptions apply. Players may hold more than one non-FIFA nationality.

No.	Pos.	Nation	Player
10	FW	JAM	Jamille Matt (at Plymouth Argyle)
17	FW	SCO	Declan McManus (at Greenock Morton)
21	GK	USA	Brendan Moore (at Torquay United)

No.	Pos.	Nation	Player
25	DF	ENG	Max Cartwright (at Chorley)
26	MF	ENG	Harvey Hodd (at Lowestoft Town)
31	GK	ENG	Joe Taylor (at Silsden)

== Transfers ==
=== Transfers in ===
Date from	Position	Nationality	Name	From	Fee	Ref.
1 July 2015	LB	(England)	Amari'i Bell	Birmingham City	Free transfer	
1 July 2015	FW	(England)	Eddie Dsane	Preston North End	Undisclosed	
1 July 2015	FW	(Scotland)	Declan McManus	Aberdeen	Free transfer	
1 July 2015	MF	(Republic of Ireland)	Jimmy Ryan	Chesterfield	Free transfer	
1 July 2015	FW	(France)	Vamara Sanogo	Metz	Free transfer	
8 July 2015	MF	(Iceland)	Eggert Jónsson	Vestsjælland	Free transfer	
22 July 2015	LW	(England)	Lyle Della-Verde	Fulham	Free transfer	
22 July 2015	MF	(England)	Bobby Grant	Blackpool	Free transfer	
28 August 2015	DF	(France)	Victor Nirennold	Free agent	Free transfer	
3 October 2015	GK	(United States)	Aleksandar Gogić	Nike Academy	Free transfer	
11 January 2016	DF	(England)	Joe Davis	Leicester City	Undisclosed	
22 January 2016	FW	(England)	Devante Cole	Bradford City	Undisclosed	
3 February 2016	DF	(Sweden)	Marcus Nilsson	Kalmar	Free Transfer	
12 February 2016	FW	(Nigeria)	Shola Ameobi	Bolton Wanderers	Free Transfer	,
5 March 2016	MF	(Scotland)	Thomas Grant	Falkirk	Free transfer	

=== Loans in ===
Date from	Position	Nationality	Name	From	Date until	Ref.
23 September 2015	DF	(England)	Richard Wood	Rotherham United	24 October 2015	
3 October 2015	DF	(Slovakia)	Dionatan Teixeira	Stoke City	2 January 2016	
3 October 2015	DF	(England)	Joe Davis	Leicester City	11 January 2016	
11 November 2015	FW	(Belgium)	David Henen	Everton	13 December 2016	
11 November 2015	MF	(England)	Tarique Fosu	Reading	2 January 2016	
21 January 2016	FW	(England)	Alex Kiwomya	Chelsea	20 February 2016	
16 February 2016	FW	(Wales)	Wes Burns	Bristol City	End of season	
18 February 2016	DF	(Scotland)	Bob Harris	Sheffield United	End of season	
18 March 2016	MF	(Scotland)	Stefan Scougall	Sheffield United	15 April 2016	

=== Loans out ===
Date from	Position	Nationality	Name	To	Date until	Ref.
21 September 2015	MF	(England)	Akil Wright	AFC Fylde	20 October 2015	
21 October 2015	DF	(England)	Max Cartwright	Chorley	21 November 2015	
21 October 2015	GK	(England)	Joe Taylor	Silsden		
31 December 2015	FW	(Scotland)	Declan McManus	Greenock Morton	End of season	
22 January 2016	FW	(England)	Jamie Proctor	Bradford City	1 February 2016	
11 March 2016	FW	(Jamaica)	Jamille Matt	Plymouth Argyle	11 April 2016	
11 March 2016	GK	(United States)	Brendan Moore	Torquay United	11 April 2016	

=== Transfers out ===
Date from	Position	Nationality	Name	To	Fee	Ref.
1 July 2015	LB	ENG	Joe Burgess	Free agent	Released	
1 July 2015	LB	SCO	Stephen Crainey	Free agent	Released	
1 July 2015	GK	ENG	Scott Davies	Tranmere Rovers	Free transfer	
1 July 2015	CB	ENG	Tom Davies	Accrington Stanley	Free transfer	
1 July 2015	LM	ENG	Josh Green	Free agent	Released	
1 July 2015	CB	ENG	Liam Hogan	Tranmere Rovers (Note: Following Hogan's release on 7 May 2015, he later signed for Tranmere Rovers on 28 May 2015.)	Free transfer	
1 July 2015	LM	NIR	Jeff Hughes	Cambridge United (Note: Following J. Hughes' release on 7 May 2015, he later signed for Cambridge United on 15 July 2015.)	Free transfer	
1 July 2015	CF	ENG	Matty Hughes	AFC Fylde (Note: Following M. Hughes' release on 7 May 2015, he later signed for AFC Fylde on 2 June 2015.)	Free transfer	
1 July 2015	DM	SCO	Stewart Murdoch	Ross County (Note: Following Murdoch's release on 7 May 2015, he later signed for Ross County on 17 June 2015.)	Free transfer	
1 July 2015	LB	TAN	Adam Nditi	Free agent	Released	
1 July 2015	CB	ENG	Mark Roberts	Cambridge United (Note: Following Roberts' release on 7 May 2015, he later signed for Cambridge United on 25 May 2015.)	Free transfer	
1 July 2015	CM	ENG	Steven Schumacher	Stevenage (Note: Following Schumacher's release on 7 May 2015, he later signed for Stevenage on 24 June 2015.)	Free transfer	
1 July 2015	GK	ENG	Mason Springthorpe	AFC Telford United (Note: Following Springthorpe's release on 7 May 2015, he later signed for AFC Telford United on 21 May 2015.)	Free transfer	
1 July 2015	CM	ENG	Andre Street	Free agent	Released	
1 July 2015	DM	ENG	Richard Wright	Free agent	Released	
28 July 2015	RW	ENG	Gareth Evans	Portsmouth	Free transfer	
1 February 2016	MF	ENG	Lyle Della-Verde	Free agent	Released	
1 February 2016	FW	ENG	Jamie Proctor	Free agent	Released	
1 February 2016	FW	ENG	Eddie Dsane	Free agent	Released	

== Pre-season friendlies ==
On 15 May 2015, Fleetwood Town announced they would travel to Germany as part of their pre-season schedule. They will play two matches during the week in Cologne, which one is against Borussia Dortmund B. A second friendly was confirmed on 6 June 2015, against Kilmarnock and a third against AFC Fylde. On 10 June 2015, it was announced Spanish side Getafe will visit on 31 July 2015. A day later they confirmed their second fixture during their time in Germany. On 12 June 2015, Fleetwood Town announced they will host Burnley on 28 July 2015.

9 July 2015 Friendly	AFC Fylde	1–0	Fleetwood Town	Warton
19:30 BST	Charles 44'	Report		Stadium: Kellamergh Park

15 July 2015 Friendly	Borussia Dortmund B	1–0	Fleetwood Town	Hennef, Germany
18:00 CEST	45' (pen.)	Report

18 July 2015 Friendly	Alemannia Aachen	2–1	Fleetwood Town	Eschweiler, Germany
15:00 CEST	Rüter 36'; 63'	Report	Sowerby 3'

25 July 2015 Friendly	Kilmarnock	3–1	Fleetwood Town	Kilmarnock, Scotland
15:00 BST	Boyd 3', 70'; Johnston 85'	Report	Bell 25'	Stadium: Rugby Park

28 July 2015 Friendly	Fleetwood Town	0–2	Burnley	Fleetwood
19:45 BST		Report	Ward 14'; Sordell 26' (pen.)	Stadium: Highbury Stadium

31 July 2015 Friendly	Fleetwood Town	2–0	Getafe	Fleetwood
19:45 BST	Sarcevic 17' (pen.), 89' (pen.)	Report		Stadium: Highbury Stadium

== Competitions ==
=== League One ===
==== League table ====
Pos	Team	Pld	W	D	L	GF	GA	GD	Pts	Promotion, qualification or relegation
17	Oldham Athletic	46	12	18	16	44	58	−14	54	
18	Chesterfield	46	15	8	23	58	70	−12	53	
19	Fleetwood Town	46	12	15	19	52	56	−4	51	
20	Shrewsbury Town	46	13	11	22	58	79	−21	50	
21	Doncaster Rovers (R)	46	11	13	22	48	64	−16	46	Relegation to EFL League Two

Updated to match(es) played on 1 July 2016. Source: BBC Sport
Rules for classification: 1) Points; 2) Goal difference; 3) Number of goals scored
(R) Relegated

==== Matches ====
On 17 June 2015, the fixtures for the forthcoming season were announced.

8 August 2015 1	Fleetwood Town	1–1	Southend United	Fleetwood
15:00 BST	McManus 33'; Jónsson (yellow card) 37'; Grant (yellow card) 52'	Report	Hunt (yellow card) 74'; Worrall 84'	Stadium: Highbury Stadium; Attendance: 3,228; Referee: David Webb

15 August 2015 2	Oldham Athletic	1–0	Fleetwood Town	Oldham
15:00 BST	Philliskirk 36'	Report	Jónsson (yellow card) 71'; Ryan (yellow card) 72'	Stadium: Boundary Park; Attendance: 4,139; Referee: Chris Sarginson

18 August 2015 3	Bury	3–4	Fleetwood Town	Bury
19:45 BST	L. Clarke 4' (yellow card) 61'; Soares 19'; Etuhu (yellow card) 75'; Rose 84'; Cameron (yellow card) 90+6'	Report	McLaughlin 17'; Hornby-Forbes 29'; Maxwell (yellow card) 47'; Proctor 69'; Sarcevic 82' (pen.)	Stadium: Gigg Lane; Attendance: 2,992; Referee: James Adcock

22 August 2015 4	Fleetwood Town	4–0	Colchester United	Fleetwood
15:00 BST	Ryan 24'; Ball 26'; Hornby-Forbes (yellow card) 47'; Proctor 49'; Matt 86'	Report	Bonne (yellow card) 39'	Stadium: Highbury Stadium; Attendance: 2,888; Referee: Chris Kavanagh

29 August 2015 5	Doncaster Rovers	2–0	Fleetwood Town	Doncaster
15:00 BST	Coppinger 17'; Main 24'	Report	Jordan (yellow card) 20'; Ryan (yellow card) 39'; McLaughlin (yellow card) 90'	Stadium: Keepmoat Stadium; Attendance: 4,876; Referee: Trevor Kettle

5 September 2015 6	Fleetwood Town	1–1	Rochdale	Fleetwood
15:00 BST	Jónsson (yellow card) 82'; Matt 87'; Maxwell (yellow card) 90+4'	Report	Vincenti 55'; Rafferty (yellow card) 86'	Stadium: Highbury Stadium; Attendance: 3,511; Referee: Geoff Eltringham

12 September 2015 7	Fleetwood Town	1–1	Bradford City	Fleetwood
15:00 BST	Ryan 3'; Andrew (yellow card) 90+5'	Report	Hanson 20'; Evans (yellow card) 90+5'	Stadium: Highbury Stadium; Attendance: 4,044; Referee: David Coote

19 September 2015 8	Wigan Athletic	2–1	Fleetwood Town	Wigan
15:00 BST	Flores 39'; Jacobs 47'; Barnett (yellow card) 72'; McCann (yellow card) 85'	Report	Ryan (yellow card) 33'; Hornby-Forbes 61'; Bell (yellow card) 90+1'	Stadium: DW Stadium; Attendance: 8,603; Referee: Fred Graham

26 September 2015 9	Fleetwood Town	1–2	Port Vale	Fleetwood
15:00 BST	Matt (yellow card) 3'; Grant 14' (yellow card) 73'; Sarcevic (yellow card) 15'; McManus (yellow card) 75'	Report	Daniel 56'; Foley 65' (pen.) (yellow card) 70'; Streete (yellow card) 70'	Stadium: Highbury Stadium; Attendance: 3,560; Referee: Seb Stockbridge

29 September 2015 10	Gillingham	5–1	Fleetwood Town	Gillingham
15:00 BST	Donnelly 18', 34' (yellow card) 78'; Houghton 28'; Egan 31'; Dickenson (yellow card) 36'; McDonald 87'	Report	Grant 12'; Jordan (yellow card) 45'; Jónsson (yellow card) 67' (yellow-red card) 81'; Sarcevic (yellow card) 70'	Stadium: Priestfield Stadium; Attendance: 5,231; Referee: Tim Robinson

3 October 2015 11	Scunthorpe United	1–0	Fleetwood Town	Scunthorpe
15:00 BST	McSheffrey (yellow card) 66'; Madden 68'	Report	Nirennold (yellow card) 61'; McLaughlin (yellow card) 87'	Stadium: Glanford Park; Attendance: 3,095; Referee: Rob Lewis

10 October 2015 12	Fleetwood Town	0–1	Coventry City	Fleetwood
15:00 BST	Ryan (yellow card) 78'	Report	Wood 90' (o.g.)	Stadium: Highbury Stadium; Attendance: 3,864; Referee: Mark Heywood

17 October 2015 13	Fleetwood Town	4–0	Burton Albion	Fleetwood
15:00 BST	McLaughlin (yellow card) 19'; Sarcevic (yellow card) 32'; Proctor 42'; Jónsson (yellow card) 47'; Grant 57', 71'; Hunter 80'	Report	El Khayati (yellow card) 60'; O'Connor (yellow card) 60'	Stadium: Highbury Stadium; Attendance: 2,893; Referee: Darren Bond

20 October 2015 14	Sheffield United	3–0	Fleetwood Town	Sheffield
19:45 BST	Adams 1', 64'; Done (yellow card) 13'; Sharp 72'	Report		Stadium: Bramall Lane; Attendance: 17,879; Referee: Eddie Ilderton

24 October 2015 15	Barnsley	0–1	Fleetwood Town	Barnsley
15:00 BST	Roberts (yellow card) 35'; Digby (yellow card) 44'; Wabara (yellow card) 75'	Report	Proctor 29'; Ryan (yellow card) 90+1'	Stadium: Oakwell; Attendance: 8,764; Referee: Carl Boyeson

31 October 2015 16	Fleetwood Town	0–1	Chesterfield	Fleetwood
15:00 GMT		Report	Ebanks-Blake 30'	Stadium: Highbury Stadium; Attendance: 3,107; Referee: Trevor Kettle

14 November 2015 17	Peterborough United	2–1	Fleetwood Town	Peterborough
15:00 GMT	Coulibaly 57' (yellow card) 90'; Anderson 77'; Smith (yellow card) 78'	Report	Ball 66'	Stadium: ABAX Stadium; Attendance: 5,462; Referee: Lee Collins

21 November 2015 18	Fleetwood Town	5–1	Swindon Town	Fleetwood
15:00 GMT	El-Abd 34' (o.g.); Pond (yellow card) 45+2'; Sarcevic 55' (pen.); Henen 64'; Fosu 69'; Grant 84'	Report	Vigouroux (yellow card) 54'; Ajose 78'; El-Abd (yellow card) 88'	Stadium: Highbury Stadium; Attendance: 2,880; Referee: Darren England

24 November 2015 19	Fleetwood Town	2–1	Millwall	Fleetwood
19:45 GMT	Jónsson 65'; Grant 89'	Report	Martin (yellow card) 74'; Morison (yellow card) 86'; Webster 90+4'	Stadium: Highbury Stadium; Attendance: 3,326; Referee: Jeremy Simpson

28 November 2015 20	Blackpool	1–0	Fleetwood Town	Blackpool
15:00 GMT	Pond 17' (o.g.); White (yellow card) 30'; Herron (yellow card) 80'; Potts (yellow card) 86'	Report	Pond (yellow card) 79'; Proctor (yellow card) 80'	Stadium: Bloomfield Road; Attendance: 7,755; Referee: Graham Scott

12 December 2015 ~~21~~ Postponed	Fleetwood Town	P–P^{1}	Walsall	Fleetwood
15:00 GMT		Report		Stadium: Highbury Stadium

19 December 2015 22	Crewe Alexandra	1–1	Fleetwood Town	Crewe
15:00 GMT	Lowe 5'	Report	Davis (yellow card) 8'; Ball 10'; Ryan (yellow card) 45'	Stadium: Gresty Road; Attendance: 3,749; Referee: Andy Madley

26 December 2015 23	Shrewsbury Town	1–1	Fleetwood Town	Shrewsbury
15:00 GMT	Clark 6'; Black (yellow card) 72'; Collins (yellow card) 77'	Report	Ryan (yellow card) 64'; Hunter 86'	Stadium: New Meadow; Attendance: 5,749; Referee: Steve Martin

28 December 2015 24	Fleetwood Town	1–3	Wigan Athletic	Fleetwood
15:00 GMT	Bell (yellow card) 54'; Pond (yellow card) 58'; Ryan (yellow card) 60'; Sarcevic 69' (pen.); Davis (yellow card) 71'	Report	Power (yellow card) 18'; Kellett 39'; Love (yellow card) 56'; Morgan (yellow card) 57'; Hiwula 83' (yellow card) 84'; Grigg (yellow card) 89'; Jacobs 90+3'	Stadium: Highbury Stadium; Attendance: 4,232; Referee: Carl Boyeson

2 January 2016 25	Fleetwood Town	2–0	Bury	Fleetwood
15:00 GMT	Hunter 49'; Grant 76'	Report	Cameron (yellow card) 26'	Stadium: Highbury Stadium; Attendance: 3,301; Referee: Nigel Miller

16 January 2016 ~~26~~ Postponed	Rochdale	P–P^{2}	Fleetwood Town	Rochdale
15:00 GMT		Report		Stadium: Spotland Stadium

19 January 2016 27	Colchester United	1–1	Fleetwood Town	Colchester
19:45 GMT	Gilbey 38'; Lee (yellow card) 90+3'	Report	Jónsson 60'	Stadium: Weston Homes Community Stadium; Attendance: 2,493; Referee: Stuart Attwell

23 January 2016 28	Fleetwood Town	0–0	Doncaster Rovers	Fleetwood
15:00 GMT	Pond (yellow card) 75'; Grant (yellow card) 88'; Davis (yellow card) 90+1'	Report	Gooch (yellow card) 75'; Evina (yellow card) 81'; Chaplow (yellow card) 90+3'	Stadium: Highbury Stadium; Attendance: 3,508; Referee: Peter Bankes

26 January 2016 ~~21~~ Postponed	Fleetwood Town	P–P^{3}	Walsall	Fleetwood
19:45 GMT		Report		Stadium: Highbury Stadium

30 January 2016 29	Bradford City	2–1	Fleetwood Town	Bradford
15:00 GMT	Meredith (yellow card) 15'; Hanson 67' (yellow card) 85'; Davies 90+3'	Report	Matt (yellow card) 29' (goal) 59'; Jónsson (yellow card) 46'	Stadium: Valley Parade; Attendance: 17,554; Referee: Kevin Wright

7 February 2016 30	Fleetwood Town	0–0	Shrewsbury Town	Fleetwood
15:00 GMT		Report	Knight-Percival (yellow card) 89'	Stadium: Highbury Stadium; Attendance: 2,539; Referee: Andy Madley

13 February 2016 31	Port Vale	0–0	Fleetwood Town	Stoke-on-Trent
15:00 GMT	Purkiss (yellow card) 45+1'; Foley (yellow card) 72'	Report	Nilsson (yellow card) 9'; Cole (yellow card) 38'; Jónsson (yellow card) 65'; Nirennold (yellow card) 78'	Stadium: Vale Park; Attendance: 4,194; Referee: Charles Breakspear

20 February 2016 32	Fleetwood Town	2–1	Scunthorpe United	Fleetwood
15:00 GMT	Hunter 16'; Grant 29'; Sarcevic (yellow card) 43'; Nilsson (yellow card) 65'; Maxwell (yellow card) 76'	Report	Bishop (yellow card) 44'; Townsend (yellow card) 56'; Madden 90' (pen.)	Stadium: Highbury Stadium; Attendance: 3,098; Referee: Ross Joyce

23 February 2016 26	Rochdale	1–0	Fleetwood Town	Rochdale
19:45 GMT	Bunney 12'; Henderson (yellow card) 30'	Report	Maxwell (yellow card) 31'	Stadium: Spotland Stadium; Attendance: 1,767; Referee: Darren Handley

27 February 2016 33	Coventry City	1–2	Fleetwood Town	Coventry
15:00 GMT	Vincelot (yellow card) 22'; Tudgay 75'; Fleck (yellow card) 78'	Report	Burns 56'; Ball 83'	Stadium: Ricoh Arena; Attendance: 11,160; Referee: Andrew Davies

1 March 2016 34	Fleetwood Town	2–1	Gillingham	Fleetwood
19:45 GMT	Burns 3'; Ameobi 9'; Hunter (yellow card) 70'	Report	Norris 36'; List (yellow card) 90'	Stadium: Highbury Stadium; Attendance: 2,133; Referee: Jeremy Simpson

5 March 2013 35	Fleetwood Town	2–2	Sheffield United	Fleetwood
15:00 GMT	Hunter 31'; Nilsson 60'; Haughton (yellow card) 74' (yellow-red card) 88'; Bell (yellow card) 90+1'	Report	Done 29'; Hammond (yellow card) 60'; Adams 90+3' (pen.)	Stadium: Highbury Stadium; Attendance: 3,479; Referee: Richard Clark

12 March 2016 36	Burton Albion	2–1	Fleetwood Town	Burton upon Trent
15:00 GMT	Duffy 26', 63'	Report	Burns 47'; Ameobi (yellow card) 50'; Nilsson (yellow card) 53'; Grant (red card) 67'	Stadium: Pirelli Stadium; Attendance: 4,415; Referee: Oliver Langford

15 March 2016 21	Fleetwood Town	0–1	Walsall	Fleetwood
19:45 GMT		Report	Bradshaw 49'	Stadium: Highbury Stadium; Attendance: 2,569; Referee: Chris Kavanagh

19 March 2016 37	Fleetwood Town	0–2	Barnsley	Fleetwood
26:00 GMT	Davis (yellow card) 31'	Report	Winnall (yellow card) 31'; Fletcher (yellow card) 40'; Davis 47' (o.g.); Scowen 84' (yellow card) 87'	Stadium: Highbury Stadium; Attendance: 3,470; Referee: Kevin Wright

26 March 2016 38	Chesterfield	0–0	Fleetwood Town	Chesterfield
15:00 GMT	Novak (yellow card) 10'; Anderson (yellow card) 32'	Report	Ryan (yellow card) 5'; Hunter (yellow card) 17'	Stadium: Proact Stadium; Attendance: 6,435; Referee: Nigel Miller

2 April 2016 39	Swindon Town	1–1	Fleetwood Town	Swindon
15:00 BST	Ormonde-Ottewill (yellow card) 47'; Sendles-White (yellow card) 53'; Traoré (yellow card) 63'; Ajose 68'	Report	Burns 6'; Jónsson (yellow card) 24'; Scougall (yellow card) 77'; Ryan (yellow card) 90+3'	Stadium: County Ground; Attendance: 6,311; Referee: Mark Brown

5 April 2016 40	Fleetwood Town	2–0	Peterborough United	Fleetwood
19:45 BST	Burns 38'; Jónsson 68'; Sarcevic (yellow card) 90'	Report	Bostwick (yellow card) 4'; Gillett (yellow card) 32'; Angol (yellow card) 59'; Ntlhe (yellow card) 62'	Stadium: Highbury Stadium; Attendance: 2,134; Referee: Peter Bankes

9 April 2016 41	Southend United	2–2	Fleetwood Town	Southend-on-Sea
15:00 BST	Thompson (yellow card) 43'; Barrett 71'; Payne 82'	Report	Grant 53'; McLaughlin 90'	Stadium: Roots Hall; Attendance: 6,644; Referee: Lee Swabey

16 April 2016 42	Fleetwood Town	1–1	Oldham Athletic	Fleetwood
15:00 BST	Scougall 67'	Report	Kelly 77'	Stadium: Highbury Stadium; Attendance: 3,889; Referee: Graham Salisbury

19 April 2016 43	Millwall	1–0	Fleetwood Town	London
19:45 BST	Romeo (yellow card) 30'; Morison 52'; Philpot (yellow card) 58'	Report	Jordan (yellow card) 58'; Pond (yellow card) 60'	Stadium: The Den; Attendance: 7,865; Referee: Ross Joyce

23 April 2016 44	Fleetwood Town	0–0	Blackpool	Fleetwood
15:00 BST	Pond (yellow card) 64'	Report	White (yellow card) 24'	Stadium: Highbury Stadium; Attendance: 5,123; Referee: Keith Stroud

2 May 2016 45	Walsall	3–1	Fleetwood Town	Walsall
12:15 BST	Bradshaw 2'; Downing 18'; Sawyers 58'	Report	Ball (yellow card) 79'; Cole 84'	Stadium: Banks's Stadium; Attendance: 6,628; Referee: Tim Robinson

8 May 2016 46	Fleetwood Town	2–0	Crewe Alexandra	Fleetwood
12:30 BST	Jónsson (yellow card) 9'; Grant 21'; Cole 24'; Hunter (yellow card) 84'	Report	Turton (yellow card) 2'	Stadium: Highbury Stadium; Attendance: 3,302; Referee: James Adcock

=== League Cup ===
On 16 June 2015, the first round draw was made, Fleetwood Town were drawn at home against Hartlepool United.

11 August 2015 First round	Fleetwood Town	0–1	Hartlepool United	Fleetwood
19:45 BST	Sarcevic (yellow card) 33'; Andrew (yellow card) 57'	Report	Paynter (yellow card) 39' (goal) 58'; Magnay (yellow card) 42'	Stadium: Highbury Stadium; Attendance: 1,892; Referee: Gary Sutton

=== Football League Trophy ===
On 5 September 2015, the second round draw was shown live on Soccer AM and drawn by Charlie Austin and Ed Skrein. Fleetwood are to host Shrewsbury Town.

6 October 2015 Second round	Fleetwood Town	2–1	Shrewsbury Town	Fleetwood
19:45 BST	Dionatan (yellow card) 49'; Hunter 69'; Haughton (yellow card) 89'; Grant 90+1'	Report	Brown 25'; Black (yellow card) 54'; Sadler (yellow card) 83'	Stadium: Highbury Stadium; Attendance: 1,267; Referee: Kevin Wright

10 November 2015 Quarterfinal	Fleetwood Town	0–0 (4–1 p)	Sheffield United	Fleetwood
19:45 GMT		Report		Stadium: Highbury Stadium; Attendance: 1,587; Referee: Christopher Kavanagh
	Penalties
	Grant (penalty scored); Ball (penalty scored); Ryan (penalty scored); Haughton (penalty scored)		(penalty scored) Baxter; (penalty missed) Sharp; (penalty missed) McEveley

8 December 2015 Semifinal	Fleetwood Town	2–0	Morecambe	Fleetwood
19:45 GMT	Jónsson (yellow card) 58'; Ball 63'; Ryan 76'	Report	Ellison (yellow card) 54'; Barkhuizen (yellow card) 72'	Stadium: Highbury Stadium; Attendance: 1,715; Referee: Paul Tierney

9 January 2016 Area Final 1st leg	Barnsley	1–1	Fleetwood Town	Barnsley
15:00 GMT	Hammill (yellow card) 45+3'; Williams (yellow card) 57'; Winnall (yellow card) 58'; Fletcher 73'	Report	Davis (yellow card) 38'; Davies 61' (o.g.); Sarcevic (yellow card) 61'; Grant (yellow card) 64'; Ryan (yellow card) 86'	Stadium: Oakwell; Attendance: 11,403; Referee: Fred Graham

4 February 2016 Area Final 2nd leg	Fleetwood Town	1–1 (a.e.t.) (2–2 agg.) (2–4 p)	Barnsley	Fleetwood
19:45 GMT	Hunter 81'	Report	Brownhill (yellow card) 42'; Hourihane 67'	Stadium: Highbury Stadium; Attendance: 3,705; Referee: Eddie Ilderton
	Penalties
	Ball (penalty scored); Grant (penalty scored); McLaughlin (penalty missed); Bell (penalty missed)		(penalty scored) Kevin Long; (penalty scored) Hourihane; (penalty missed) Scowen; (penalty scored) Winnall; (penalty scored) Hammill

=== FA Cup ===
7 November 2015 First round	Walsall	2–0	Fleetwood Town	Blowick
15:00 GMT	Evans 19'; Forde 90+2'	Report	Davis (yellow card) 33'; Matt (yellow card) 88'	Stadium: Merseyrail Community Stadium; Attendance: 2,532; Referee: Ross Joyce

=== Lancashire Senior Cup ===
On the Lancashire FA website the first round details were announced, Southport will face Fleetwood Town.

30 September 2015 First round	Southport	1–2	Fleetwood Town	Blowick
19:30 BST				Stadium: Merseyrail Community Stadium

28 October 2015 Quarter-finals	Fleetwood Town	1–1 (6–7 p)	Oldham Athletic	Fleetwood
14:00 BST		Report		Stadium: Highbury Stadium; Referee: Paul Hodskinson

== Squad statistics ==
As of match played 19 March 2016

=== Appearances and goals ===
No.	Pos	Nat	Player	Total		Championship		FA Cup		League Cup		League Trophy	
No.	Pos	Nat	Player	Apps	Goals	Apps	Goals	Apps	Goals	Apps	Goals	Apps	Goals
1	GK	(Wales) WAL	Chris Maxwell	44	0	37	0	1	0	1	0	5	0
2	DF	(Northern Ireland) NIR	Conor McLaughlin	34	1	29	1	1	0	1	0	3	0
3	DF	(England) ENG	Danny Andrew	9	0	8	0	0	0	1	0	0	0
4	DF	(England) ENG	Stephen Jordan	13	0	11+1	0	0	0	1	0	0	0
5	MF	(Iceland) ISL	Eggert Jónsson	36	2	28+2	2	1	0	1	0	4	0
6	DF	(England) ENG	Nathan Pond	19	0	13+1	0	1	0	0	0	4	0
7	DF	(England) ENG	Amari'i Bell	42	0	35	0	1	0	1	0	5	0
8	MF	(Republic of Ireland) IRL	Jimmy Ryan	40	3	34	2	1	0	1	0	4	1
9	FW	(Nigeria) NGR	Shola Ameobi	9	1	7+2	1	0	0	0	0	0	0
11	FW	(Wales) WAL	Wes Burns	8	3	5+3	3	0	0	0	0	0	0
12	MF	(England) ENG	Tyler Hornby-Forbes	19	2	10+4	2	1	0	0	0	2+2	0
14	FW	(England) ENG	Bobby Grant	37	9	18+13	8	0	0	0+1	0	3+2	1
15	DF	(France) FRA	Victor Nirennold	17	0	11+4	0	0	0	0	0	2	0
18	MF	(England) ENG	Antoni Sarcevic	38	3	31+2	3	1	0	1	0	3	0
19	FW	(France) FRA	Vamara Sanogo	2	0	0+1	0	0	0	0+1	0	0	0
22	FW	(England) ENG	Ashley Hunter	21	7	11+6	5	0	0	0	0	1+3	2
23	FW	(England) ENG	David Ball	33	5	22+6	4	1	0	0+1	0	0+3	1
27	MF	(England) ENG	Nick Haughton	23	0	6+11	0	0+1	0	0	0	3+2	0
28	FW	(England) ENG	Jack Sowerby	8	0	3+5	0	0	0	0	0	0	0
30	DF	(Scotland) SCO	Bob Harris	1	0	1	0	0	0	0	0	0	0
31	DF	(Sweden) SWE	Marcus Nilsson	10	1	9+1	1	0	0	0	0	0	0
37	MF	(Scotland) SCO	Stefan Scougall	2	0	0+1	0	0	0	0+1	0	0	0
42	MF	(Scotland) SCO	Thomas Grant	2	0	2	0	0	0	0	0	0	0
44	FW	(England) ENG	Devante Cole	8	0	2+6	0	0	0	0	0	0	0
45	FW	(Belgium) BEL	David Henen	11	1	8+1	1	0	0	0	0	2	0
47	DF	(England) ENG	Joe Davis	25	0	17+2	0	1	0	0	0	4+1	0
Players away from the club on loan:
10	FW	(Jamaica) JAM	Jamille Matt	21	3	7+10	3	0+1	0	0	0	3	0
17	FW	(Scotland) SCO	Declan McManus	10	1	3+4	1	0+1	0	1	0	1	0
Players who appeared for Fleetwood Town but left during the season:
9	FW	(England) ENG	Jamie Proctor	26	4	13+8	4	1	0	1	0	2+1	0
11	MF	(England) ENG	Lyle Della-Verde	8	0	6+1	0	0	0	1	0	0	0
39	MF	(England) ENG	Tarique Fosu	7	1	4+2	1	0	0	0	0	1	0
42	FW	(England) ENG	Alex Kiwomya	4	0	2+2	0	0	0	0	0	0	0
45	DF	(England) ENG	Richard Wood	7	0	6	0	0	0	0	0	1	0
46	DF	(Slovakia) SVK	Dionatan Teixeira	10	0	8	0	0	0	0	0	2	0

=== Goal scorers ===
As of match played 15 March 2016

Place	Position	Nation	Number	Name	Championship	FA Cup	League Cup	League Trophy	Total
1	FW	(England)	14	Bobby Grant	8	0	0	1	9
2	FW	(England)	22	Ashley Hunter	5	0	0	2	7
3	FW	(England)	23	David Ball	4	0	0	1	5
4	FW	(England)	9	Jamie Proctor	4	0	0	0	4
5	MF	(England)	18	Antoni Sarcevic	3	0	0	0	3
5	FW	(Jamaica)	10	Jamille Matt	3	0	0	0	3
5	FW	(Wales)	11	Wes Burns	3	0	0	0	3
5	MF	(Republic of Ireland)	8	Jimmy Ryan	2	0	0	1	3
9	MF	(England)	12	Tyler Hornby-Forbes	2	0	0	0	2
9	MF	(Iceland)	5	Eggert Jónsson	2	0	0	0	2
9				Own goal	1	0	0	1	2
12	FW	(Scotland)	17	Declan McManus	1	0	0	0	1
12	DF	(England)	2	Conor McLaughlin	1	0	0	0	1
12	FW	(Belgium)	45	David Henen	1	0	0	0	1
12	MF	(England)	39	Tarique Fosu	1	0	0	0	1
12	FW	(Nigeria)	9	Shola Ameobi	1	0	0	0	1
12	DF	(Sweden)	31	Marcus Nilsson	1	0	0	0	1
Total					43	0	0	6	49

=== Disciplinary record ===
As of match played 19 March 2016

Position	Nation	Number	Name	Championship		FA Cup		League Cup		League Trophy		Total	
Position	Nation	Number	Name	Yellow card	Red card	Yellow card	Red card	Yellow card	Red card	Yellow card	Red card	Yellow card	Red card
1	(Wales)	GK	Chris Maxwell	4	0	0	0	0	0	0	0	4	0
2	(Northern Ireland)	DF	Conor McLaughlin	3	0	0	0	0	0	0	0	3	0
3	(England)	DF	Danny Andrew	1	0	0	0	1	0	0	0	2	0
4	(England)	DF	Stephen Jordan	2	0	0	0	0	0	0	0	2	0
5	(Iceland)	MF	Eggert Jónsson	8	1	0	0	0	0	1	0	9	1
6	(England)	DF	Nathan Pond	4	0	0	0	0	0	0	0	4	0
7	(England)	DF	Amari'i Bell	3	0	0	0	0	0	0	0	3	0
8	(Republic of Ireland)	MF	Jimmy Ryan	8	0	0	0	0	0	1	0	9	0
9	(England)	FW	Jamie Proctor	1	0	0	0	0	0	0	0	1	0
9	(Nigeria)	FW	Shola Ameobi	1	0	0	0	0	0	0	0	1	0
10	(Jamaica)	FW	Jamille Matt	2	0	1	0	0	0	0	0	3	0
12	(England)	MF	Tyler Hornby-Forbes	1	0	0	0	0	0	0	0	1	0
14	(England)	FW	Bobby Grant	3	1	0	0	0	0	1	0	4	1
15	(France)	DF	Victor Nirennold	2	0	0	0	0	0	0	0	2	0
17	(Scotland)	FW	Declan McManus	1	0	0	0	0	0	0	0	1	0
18	(England)	MF	Antoni Sarcevic	4	0	0	0	1	0	1	0	6	0
22	(England)	FW	Ashley Hunter	1	0	0	0	0	0	0	0	1	0
27	(England)	MF	Nick Haughton	2	1	0	0	0	0	1	0	3	1
31	(Sweden)	DF	Marcus Nilsson	3	0	0	0	0	0	0	0	3	0
44	(England)	FW	Devante Cole	1	0	0	0	0	0	0	0	1	0
46	(Slovakia)	DF	Dionatan Teixeira	0	0	0	0	0	0	1	0	1	0
47	(England)	DF	Joe Davis	4	0	1	0	0	0	1	0	6	0
Total				59	3	2	0	2	0	7	0	70	3

== Notes ==
- The match between Fleetwood Town and Walsall on 12 December 2015, was postponed due to a waterlogged pitch.
- The match between Colchester United and Fleetwood Town on 16 January 2016, was postponed due to a frozen pitch.
- The rearranged match between Fleetwood Town and Walsall set for 26 January 2016, was again postponed due to a waterlogged pitch, with the match being rescheduled for 15 March 2016.
