= 2014–15 Fleetwood Town F.C. season =

Fleetwood Town
2014–15 season
- Chairman: Andrew Pilley
- Manager: Graham Alexander
- Stadium: Highbury Stadium
- League One: 10th
- FA Cup: First round
- League Cup: First round
- Football League Trophy: First round
Home colours	Away colours	Third colours

The 2014–15 season is Fleetwood Town's first season in the Football League One following promotion via the 2014 Football League play-offs.

== Transfers ==
=== In ===
No.	Pos.	Nat.	Name	Age	EU	Moving from	Type	Transfer window	Ends	Transfer fee	Source
3	DF	(England)	Danny Andrew	23	EU	Macclesfield Town	Transfer	Summer	2016	Undisclosed	
24	MF	(England)	Keith Southern	33	EU	Huddersfield Town	Free transfer	Summer	2015	Free	
19	FW	(England)	Jamie Proctor	22	EU	Crawley Town	Free transfer	Summer	2016	Free	
33	DF	(Scotland)	Stephen Crainey	33	EU	Wigan Athletic	Free transfer	Summer	2015	Free	
—	DF	(England)	Andre Streete	18	EU	Wolverhampton Wanderers	Free transfer	Winter	2015	Free	
—	FW	(England)	Jack Sowerby	19	EU	Squires Gate	Transfer	Winter	2015	Undisclosed	
—	MF	(England)	Harvey Hodd	19	EU	Lowestoft Town	Free transfer	Winter	2016	Free	
38	GK	(England)	Mason Springthorpe	20	EU	Ellesmere Rangers	Free transfer	Winter	2015	Free	
—	MF	(England)	Ashley Hunter	19	EU	Ilkeston	Free transfer	Winter	2016	Free	
—	GK	(United States)	Brendan Moore	22	EU	Portland Timbers (United States)	Free transfer	Winter	2016	Free	
—	MF	(England)	Akil Wright	18	EU	Ilkeston	Transfer	Winter	2016	Undisclosed	

=== Loaned In ===
No.	Pos.	Name	Country	Age	Loan club	Started	Ended	Start source	End source
12	MF	Josh Morris	(England)	22	Blackburn Rovers	10 July 2014	3 January 2015		
29	FW	Adam Campbell	(England)	19	Newcastle United	7 August 2014	4 September 2014		
9	FW	Stephen Dobbie	(Scotland)	31	Crystal Palace	7 August 2014	30 June 2015		
20	FW	Liam McAlinden	(Republic of Ireland)	21	Wolverhampton Wanderers	2 October 2014	30 October 2014		
29	FW	Tom Hitchcock	(England)	22	Milton Keynes Dons	31 October 2014	28 December 2014		
—	FW	Martin Paterson	(Northern Ireland)	27	Huddersfield Town	13 November 2014	3 January 2015		
12	MF	Josh Morris	(England)	23	Blackburn Rovers	8 January 2015	30 June 2015		
20	FW	Liam McAlinden	(Republic of Ireland)	21	Wolverhampton Wanderers	15 January 2015	30 June 2015		
15	DF	Adam Chicksen	(England)	23	Brighton & Hove Albion	27 February 2015	29 March 2015		

Sources: For loan start source see "Start source". For loan end source see "End source".
EU = if holds or not a European Union passport; Country: when 2 flags, 1st flag = country that plays for internationally, 2nd flag = country of birth; No. = number on jersey; P = Position (for position name, pause mouse pointer on abbreviation); Name = Name on jersey (for more extensive name, pause mouse pointer on name); In/Out = In: The player came in on loan, Out: The player went out on loan; Loan club = the club that the player moved on loan to or the club that the player came from on loan; Started = the date when the player's loan started; Ended = the date when the player's loan ended.

=== Out ===
No.	Pos.	Name	Country	Age	Type	Moving to	Transfer window	Transfer fee	Apps	Goals	Source
13	DF	Alan Goodall	(England)	32	Released	Morecambe	Summer	Free	56	4	
9	FW	Jon Parkin	(England)	32	Released	Forest Green Rovers	Summer	Free	53	17	
12	MF	Junior Brown	(England)	25	Released	Oxford United	Summer	Free	106	13	
16	DF	Ryan Cresswell	(England)	26	Transfer	Northampton Town	Summer	Undisclosed	21	1	
17	MF	Matty Blair	(England)	25	Released	Mansfield Town	Winter	Free	32	3	

EU = if holds or not a European Union passport; Country: when 2 flags, 1st flag = country that plays for internationally, 2nd flag = country of birth; N = number on jersey; P = Position (for position name, pause mouse pointer on abbreviation); Name = Name on jersey (for more extensive name, pause mouse pointer on name); Age = age on the day of the signing; Moving from = only indicate the club the player was playing before start playing for this club in this season, for the type of the moving see Status column; Moving to = only indicates the club the player is going to play next, for the type of the moving see Status column; Ends = when the player's current contract ends; n/a = Not applicable; Apps = Total number of competitive appearances (including substitute appearances) at the club prior to departure; Goals = Total number of competitive goals scored at the club prior to departure.

=== Loaned out ===
No.	Pos.	Name	Country	Age	Loan club	Started	Ended	Start source	End source
22	FW	Matty Hughes	(England)	22	Chester	7 October 2014	6 December 2014		
21	FW	Jamie Allen	(England)	19	A.F.C. Fylde	10 October 2014	6 December 2014		
26	DF	Tom Davies	(England)	21	Alfreton Town	14 December 2014	15 November 2014		
1	GK	Scott Davies	(England)	27	Morecambe	24 October 2014	4 January 2015		
4	MF	Stewart Murdoch	(Scotland)	24	Northampton Town	30 October 2014	2 January 2015		
14	DF	Liam Hogan	(England)	25	Macclesfield Town	3 November 2014	9 December 2014		
17	MF	Matty Blair	(England)	25	Cambridge United	17 November 2014	31 December 2014		
—	GK	Liam Bleeker	(England)	18	Kendal Town	4 January 2015	31 January 2015		
—	MF	Josh Green	(England)	19	Chester	4 January 2015	31 January 2015		
22	FW	Matty Hughes	(England)	23	Chester	16 January 2015	30 June 2015		
25	MF	Keith Southern	(England)	33	Shrewsbury Town	19 January 2015	30 June 2015		
1	GK	Scott Davies	(England)	27	Accrington Stanley	2 February 2015	30 June 2015		

Sources: For loan start source see "Start source". For loan end source see "End source".
EU = if holds or not a European Union passport; Country: when 2 flags, 1st flag = country that plays for internationally, 2nd flag = country of birth; No. = number on jersey; P = Position (for position name, pause mouse pointer on abbreviation); Name = Name on jersey (for more extensive name, pause mouse pointer on name); In/Out = In: The player came in on loan, Out: The player went out on loan; Loan club = the club that the player moved on loan to or the club that the player came from on loan; Started = the date when the player's loan started; Ended = the date when the player's loan ended.

== Match details ==
=== Pre-season ===
10 July 2014	Colwyn Bay (Wales)	0–5	Fleetwood Town	Llanelian Road, Old Colwyn
19:45 BST		Report	Ball 24'; Murdoch 36'; Allen 46'; Matt 48', 83'

16 July 2014	Terek Grozny (Russia)	3–2	Fleetwood Town	Miesbach
17:00 BST	Semyonov 23'; Pond 40' (o.g.); Grozav 88'	Report	Cresswell 14'; Ball 75'

18 July 2014	Fleetwood Town	2–1	(Austria) FC Pinzgau	Bischofshofen
18:00 BST	Allen 20'; Proctor 40'	Report	Hasic (--)

27 July 2014	Inverness Caledonian Thistle (Scotland)	2–1	Fleetwood Town	Inverness
14:30 BST	McKay 44'; Vincent 61'	Report	Pond 56'	Stadium: Caledonian Stadium

2 August 2014	Fleetwood Town	0–0	(Scotland) Partick Thistle	Fleetwood
15:00 BST		Report		Stadium: Highbury Stadium; Attendance: 2,029

=== League One ===
==== League table ====
Pos	Team	Pld	W	D	L	GF	GA	GD	Pts
8	Rochdale	46	19	6	21	72	66	+6	63
9	Peterborough United	46	18	9	19	53	56	−3	63
10	Fleetwood Town	46	17	12	17	49	52	−3	63
11	Barnsley	46	17	11	18	62	61	+1	62
12	Gillingham	46	16	14	16	65	66	−1	62

Updated to match(es) played on 3 May 2015. Source: BBC Sport
Rules for classification: 1) Points; 2) Goal difference; 3) Number of goals scored

==== Matches ====
The fixtures for the 2014–15 season were announced on 18 June 2014 at 9am.

9 August 2014 1	Fleetwood Town	2–1	Crewe Alexandra	Fleetwood
15:00	Ball 47'; Proctor 54'; Hogan (yellow card) 90+3'	Report	Inman (yellow card) 79' (goal) 90+4' (pen.)	Stadium: Highbury Stadium; Attendance: 3,774; Referee: Gary Sutton

16 August 2014 2	Notts County	0–1	Fleetwood Town	Nottingham
16:00			Jamie Proctor 45+2'	Stadium: Meadow Lane; Attendance: 5,051; Referee: Mark Heywood

19 August 2014 3	Scunthorpe United	0–2	Fleetwood Town	Scunthorpe
19:45	O'Neill (yellow card) 78'		Evans (yellow card) 55' (goal) 80'; Proctor 70'	Stadium: Glanford Park; Attendance: 2,773; Referee: Andy Woolmer

23 August 2014 4	Fleetwood Town	0–0	Chesterfield	Fleetwood
15:00		Report		Stadium: Highbury Stadium; Attendance: 3,512; Referee: Andrew Madley

30 August 2014 5	Fleetwood Town	1–1	Leyton Orient	Fleetwood
15:00	Dobbie 83'	Report	Henderson 34'	Stadium: Highbury Stadium; Attendance: 3,222; Referee: Richard Clark

6 September 2014 6	Oldham Athletic	1–0	Fleetwood Town	Oldham
15:00	Forte 45+3' (pen.)	Report	Hogan (yellow card) 35'	Stadium: Boundary Park; Attendance: 4,425; Referee: Mark Brown

13 September 2014 7	Crawley Town	1–0	Fleetwood Town	Crawley
15:00	McLeod 78'	Report		Stadium: Broadfield Stadium; Attendance: 1,905; Referee: Brendan Malone

17 September 2014 8	Fleetwood Town	0–0	Barnsley	Fleetwood
19:45		Report		Stadium: Highbury Stadium; Attendance: 3,535; Referee: Darren Bond

20 September 2014 9	Fleetwood Town	3–3	Bristol City	Fleetwood
15:00	Morris 22'; Proctor 61'; Dobbie 89'	Report	Agard 31', 47' (yellow card) 82'; Wilbraham 51'; Smith (yellow card) 80'	Stadium: Highbury Stadium; Attendance: 3,700; Referee: Scott Mathieson

27 September 2014 10	Peterborough United	1–0	Fleetwood Town	Peterborough
15:00	Washington 45+1'		Crainey (yellow card) 45+4' (yellow-red card) 82'; Sarcevic (yellow card) 81'; Pond (yellow card) 90+6'	Stadium: London Road Stadium; Attendance: 5,698; Referee: Andy D'Urso

4 October 2014 11	Fleetwood Town	1–0	Port Vale	Fleetwood
15:00	Dobbie 80' (pen.)	Report	Slew (red card) 44'; McGivern (yellow card) 79'; Lines (yellow card) 81'	Stadium: Highbury Stadium; Attendance: 4,196; Referee: Kevin Johnson

11 October 2014 12	Colchester United	2–1	Fleetwood Town	Colchester
15:00	Massey 40', 76'; Watt (yellow card) 42'	Report	McAlinden 18'; Proctor (yellow card) 42'	Stadium: Colchester Community Stadium; Attendance: 3,383; Referee: Graham Scott

18 October 2014 13	Fleetwood Town	3–1	Doncaster Rovers	Fleetwood
15:00	Dobbie 11'; McAlinden 37'; Schumacher (yellow card) 39'; Ball 73'; Crainey (yellow card) 75'; Southern (yellow card) 85'	Report	Tyson 17'	Stadium: Highbury; Attendance: 3,785; Referee: Steve Martin

21 October 2014 14	Milton Keynes Dons	2–1	Fleetwood Town	Milton Keynes
19:45	Spence (yellow card) 59'; McFadzean 61'; Afobe 84'	Report	Ball 52'; McLaughlin (yellow card) 59'; Dobbie (yellow card) 61'; Pond (yellow card) 84'; Morris (yellow card) 90+7'	Stadium: Stadium mk Attendance: 6,736; Referee: Gavin Ward

25 October 2014 15	Preston North End	3–2	Fleetwood Town	Preston
15:00	Garner 60', 63', 79'	Report	Jordan 1'; Laird 7' (o.g.)	Stadium: Deepdale; Attendance: 13,280; Referee: Eddie Ilderton

1 November 2014 16	Fleetwood Town	1–0	Gillingham	Fleetwood
15:00	Hitchcock 3'	Report		Stadium: Highbury Stadium; Attendance: 2,951; Referee: Tony Harrington

15 November 2014 17	Yeovil Town	0–1	Fleetwood Town	Yeovil
15:00	Dawson (yellow card) 33'; Edwards (yellow card) 39'	Report	Morris (yellow card) 36'; Paterson (yellow card) 63'; Hughes 87'; Roberts (yellow card) 90+1'	Stadium: Huish Park; Attendance: 3,577; Referee: Mick Russell

22 November 2014 18	Fleetwood Town	0–1	Walsall	Fleetwood
15:00	McLaughlin (yellow card) 48'	Report	Sawyers 35'	Stadium: Highbury Stadium; Attendance: 3,224; Referee: Mark Haywood

29 November 2014 19	Swindon Town	1–0	Fleetwood Town	Swindon
15:00	Gladwin 86'; Luongo (yellow card) 90+4'	Report	Jordan (yellow card) 18'; Hitchcock (yellow card) 29'; Schumacher (yellow card) 40'; Evans (yellow card) 61'	Stadium: County Ground; Attendance: 10,506; Referee: Keith Hill

13 December 2014 20	Fleetwood Town	1–1	Sheffield United	Fleetwood
15:00	Sarcevic 53'; Roberts (yellow card) 61'; Hughes (yellow card) 90'	Report	Harris 8'; McEveley (yellow card) 53'; McCarthy (yellow card) 58'	Stadium: Highbury Stadium; Attendance: 4,269; Referee: Andre Marriner

20 December 2014 21	Coventry City	1–1	Fleetwood Town	Coventry
15:00	Haynes (yellow card) 46'; Jackson 80' (yellow card) 87'	Report	Webster 19' (o.g.); Hughes (yellow card) 52'	Stadium: Ricoh Arena; Attendance: 10,254; Referee: Lee Collins

26 December 2014 22	Fleetwood Town	0–2	Bradford City	Fleetwood
15:00	McLaughlin (yellow card) 73'; Hitchcock (yellow card) 90+2'	Report	Hanson 42'; Morais 78'	Stadium: Highbury Stadium; Attendance: 4,278; Referee: Chris Sarginson

28 December 2014 23	Rochdale	0–2	Fleetwood Town	Rochdale
15:00		Report	Roberts 17'; Morris 38'; McLaughlin (yellow card) 53'	Stadium: Spotland Stadium; Attendance: 3,123; Referee: Bobby Madley

3 January 2015 24	Fleetwood Town	2–2	Swindon Town	Fleetwood
15:00	Hughes (yellow card) 28'; Morris 49', 59'; McLaughlin (yellow card) 84'; Crainey (yellow card) 89'	Report	Williams 71'; Toffolo (yellow card) 86'; Thompson 88'	Stadium: Highbury Stadium; Attendance: 3,346; Referee: Geoff Eltringham

10 January 2015 25	Leyton Orient	0–1	Fleetwood Town	Leyton
15:00	Lowry (yellow card) 88'; Plasmati (yellow card) 90+2'; Vincelot (yellow card) 90+3'	Report	Evans 46'; Proctor (yellow card) 63'; Hughes (yellow card) 83'	Stadium: Brisbane Road; Attendance: 4,947; Referee: Fred Graham

17 January 2015 26	Fleetwood Town	0–2	Oldham Athletic	Fleetwood
15:00	Jordan (yellow card) 63'; Sarcevic (yellow card) 90+1'	Report	Winchester 51'; Jones 64'	Stadium: Highbury Stadium; Attendance: 4,312; Referee: Mick Russell

24 January 2015 27	Fleetwood Town	1–0	Crawley Town	Fleetwood
15:00	Sarcevic 43'; Roberts (yellow card) 50'	Report	Wordsworth (yellow card) 45+1'	Stadium: Highbury Stadium; Attendance: 2,601; Referee: Seb Stockbridge

1 February 2015 28	Bristol City	2–0	Fleetwood Town	Bristol
15:00	K. Smith (yellow card) 28'; M. Smith 52'; Saville (yellow card) 68'; Emmanuel-Thomas 90+2'	Report	Hornby-Forbes (yellow card) 36'; Evans (yellow card) 57'; Jordan (yellow card) 69'; McLaughlin (yellow card) 90+2'	Stadium: Ashton Gate; Attendance: 11,654; Referee: Gavin Ward

7 February 2015 29	Fleetwood Town	1–1	Peterborough United	Fleetwood
15:00	Crainey (yellow card) 17'; Roberts 78'; Hunter (yellow card) 87'	Report	Newell 64' (yellow card) 87'	Stadium: Highbury Stadium; Attendance: 3,188; Referee: Andy D'Urso

10 February 2015 30	Barnsley	1–2	Fleetwood Town	Barnsley
19:45	Ramage 5' (yellow card) 72'; Hemmings (yellow card) 66'	Report	McLaughlin 14'; Haughton (yellow card) 17'; McAlinden 33'; Mxwell (yellow card) 90+4'	Stadium: Oakwell; Attendance: 8,328; Referee: David Coote

14 February 2015 31	Crewe Alexandra	2–0	Fleetwood Town	Crewe
15:00	Ajose 42'; Haber 59'	Report	McLaughlin (yellow card) 20'	Stadium: Gresty Road; Attendance: 4,135; Referee: Stuart Attwell

21 February 2015 32	Fleetwood Town	2–1	Notts County	Fleetwood
15:00 GMT	McAlinden 25'; Hughes (yellow card) 28'; Haughton (yellow card) 50'; Crainey (yellow card) 57' (yellow-red card) 69'; Ball 62'	Report	Thompson 11'; Jones (yellow card) 68'; Mullins (yellow card) 88'	Stadium: Highbury Stadium; Attendance: 3,529; Referee: David Webb

28 February 2015 33	Chesterfield	3–0	Fleetwood Town	Chesterfield
15:00 GMT	Lavery 31'; Hird 42'; Morsy 63'	Report	McLaughlin (yellow card) 12'; Roberts (yellow card) 17'; Sarcevic (yellow card) 44' (yellow-red card); Hughes (yellow card) 52'; Jordan (yellow card) 67'; Evans (yellow card) 90+5'	Stadium: Proact Stadium; Attendance: 6,497; Referee: Patrick Miller

3 March 2015 34	Fleetwood Town	2–2	Scunthorpe United	Fleetwood
19:45 GMT	Procter 3'; Chicksen (yellow card) 38'; McLaughlin (yellow card) 56'; Morris 71'	Report	McSheffrey 45'; Evans 74'	Stadium: Highbury Stadium; Attendance: 2,667; Referee: Nigel Miller

7 March 2015 35	Sheffield United	1–2	Fleetwood Town	Sheffield
15:00 GMT	Basham (yellow card) 34'; Done 39'; McEveley (yellow card) 45+1'; Adams (yellow card) 90+5'	Report	Morris 25' (yellow card) 26'; Haughton 35'; Maxwell (yellow card) 55'; Murdoch (yellow card) 61'; Crainey (yellow card) 90+7'	Stadium: Bramall Lane; Attendance: 18,668; Referee: Darren Deadman

14 March 2015 36	Fleetwood Town	1–0	Rochdale	Fleetwood
15:00 GMT	Morris 59'; Evans (yellow card) 76'; Procter (yellow card) 90'	Report	Cannon (yellow card) 14'	Stadium: Highbury Stadium; Attendance: 3,822; Referee: Jeremy Simpson

17 March 2015 37	Fleetwood Town	0–2	Coventry City	Fleetwood
19:45 GMT	Schumacher (yellow card) 60'; Hunter (yellow card) 80'; Pond (yellow card) 85'	Report	Stokes (yellow card) 84'; Samuel 88'; Nouble 90+5'	Stadium: Highbury Stadium; Attendance: 3,017; Referee: Peter Bankes

21 March 2015 38	Bradford City	2–2	Fleetwood Town	Bradford
15:00 GMT	Stead 10'; McArdle (yellow card) 45+1'; Routis 50'	Report	Roberts (yellow card) 36'; McLaughlin (yellow card) 59'; Proctor 86'; Pond 90+2'	Stadium: Valley Parade; Attendance: 12,963; Referee: Steve Martin

29 March 2015 39	Fleetwood Town	1–1	Preston North End	Fleetwood
14:15 GMT	Sarcevic (yellow card) 34'; Jordan (yellow card) 45+2'; Hornby-Forbes (yellow card) 52'; Ball 85'	Report	Johnson 9'; King (yellow card) 60'; Huntington (yellow card) 65'	Stadium: Highbury Stadium; Attendance: 5,110; Referee: Andy Madley

3 April 2015 40	Gillingham	0–1	Fleetwood Town	Gillingham, Kent
15:00 GMT		Report	Evans 18'; Ball (yellow card) 30'; Roberts (yellow card) 63'; Murdoch (yellow card) 85'	Stadium: Priestfield Stadium; Attendance: 7,961; Referee: Brendan Malone

6 April 2015 41	Fleetwood Town	4-0	Yeovil Town	Fleetwood
15:00 GMT	Ball 7' 16' (yellow card) 68'; Proctor 32'; Hunter 83'	Report	Foley (yellow card) 61'	Stadium: Highbury Stadium; Attendance: 3,086; Referee: Chris Kavanagh

11 April 2015 42	Walsall	1–0	Fleetwood Town	Walsall
15:00 GMT	Cook (yellow card) 9'; Bradshaw 86'	Report		Stadium: Bescot Stadium; Attendance: 3,534; Referee: Andy Haines

14 April 2015 43	Fleetwood Town	0–3	Milton Keynes Dons	Fleetwood
19:45 GMT	Morris (yellow card) 19'; Chicksen (yellow card) 61'; Pond (yellow card) 89'; Proctor (yellow card) 89'	Report	Baker 55'; Grigg 74'; Alli 76' (yellow card) 88'; Kay (yellow card) 83'; Lewington (yellow card) 88'	Stadium: Highbury Stadium; Attendance: 2,752; Referee: Mark Haywood

18 April 2015 44	Doncaster Rovers	0–0	Fleetwood Town	Doncaster
15:00 GMT	Lund (yellow card) 52'	Report	McLaughlin (yellow card) 19'	Stadium: Keepmoat Stadium; Attendance: 6,211; Referee: Tim Robinson

25 April 2015 45	Fleetwood Town	2–3	Colchester United	Fleetwood
15:00 GMT	Proctor 65'; Ball 74'; McLaughlin (yellow card) 90+5'	Report	Moncur 47'; Massey 84'; Porter 87' (pen.)	Stadium: Highbury Stadium; Attendance: 3,129; Referee: Darren Bond

3 May 2015 46	Port Vale	1–2	Fleetwood Town	Stoke-on-Trent
12:15 GMT	Duffy (yellow card) 72'; O'Connor 90+4'	Report	Morris 17'; Roberts 26'	Stadium: Vale Park; Attendance: 5,355; Referee: Keith Hill

=== FA Cup ===
The draw for the first round of the FA Cup was made on 27 October 2014.

8 November 2014 First round	Cambridge United	1–0	Fleetwood Town	Cambridge
15:00	Appiah 80'	Report	Hitchcock (yellow card) 68'; Proctor (red card) 73'	Stadium: Abbey Stadium; Attendance: 2,870; Referee: Gary Sutton

=== League Cup ===
The draw for the first round was made on 17 June 2014 at 10am. Fleetwood Town were drawn at away to Rotherham United.

12 August 2014 Round One	Rotherham United	1–0 (a.e.t.)	Fleetwood Town	Rotherham
19:45	Morgan (yellow card) 44'; Skarz (yellow card) 88'; Derbyshire 109' (pen.)	Report		Stadium: New York Stadium; Attendance: 4,487; Referee: Nigel Miller

=== Football League Trophy ===
2 September 2014 Round One	Fleetwood Town	1–3	Morecambe	Fleetwood
19:45	Evans 12'; Murdoch (yellow card) 90+5'	Report	Amond 28', 80'; Redshaw (yellow card) 12' (goal) 34'; Wright (yellow card) 78'	Stadium: Highbury Stadium; Attendance: 2,045; Referee: Chris Sarginson
