= Amari'i Bell =

Jamaican footballer (born 1994)

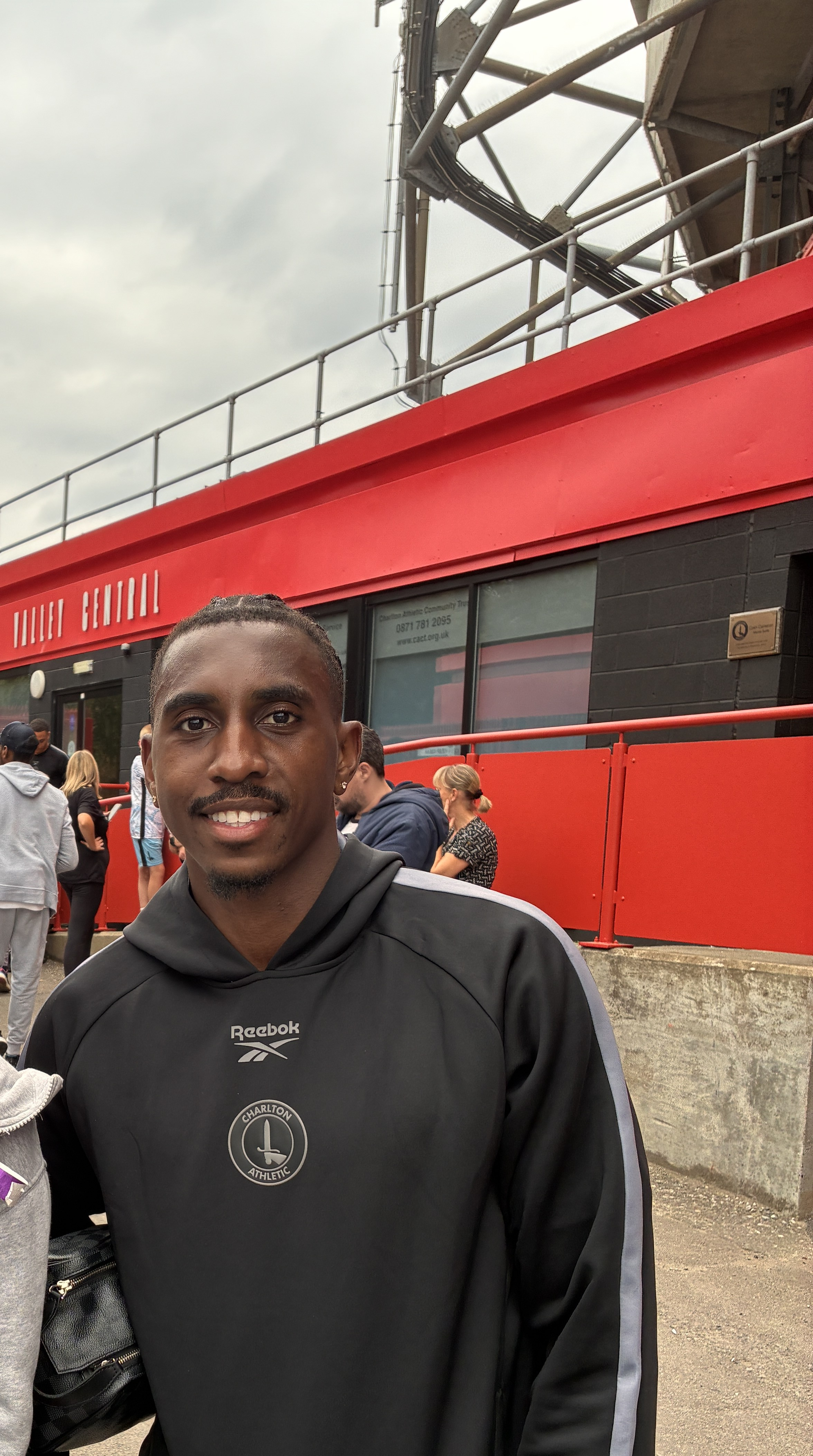
- Amari'i Bell in 2025

Personal information
- Full name: Amari'i Kyren Bell
- Date of birth: 5 May 1994 (age 32)
- Place of birth: Burton upon Trent, England
- Height: 5 ft 11 in (1.80 m)
- Position: Left back

Team information
- Current team: Charlton Athletic
- Number: 17

Youth career
- West Bromwich Albion
- –2011: Solihull Moors
- 2011–2012: Birmingham City

Senior career*
Years	Team	Apps	(Gls)
2012–2015	Birmingham City	1	(0)
2013	→ Nuneaton Town (loan)	8	(0)
2013	→ Nuneaton Town (loan)	11	(0)
2014	→ Kidderminster Harriers (loan)	10	(2)
2014	→ Mansfield Town (loan)	0	(0)
2014–2015	→ Swindon Town (loan)	10	(0)
2015	→ Gillingham (loan)	7	(0)
2015–2018	Fleetwood Town	115	(6)
2018–2021	Blackburn Rovers	90	(3)
2021–2025	Luton Town	137	(2)
2025–	Charlton Athletic	46	(0)

International career^{‡}
2021–	Jamaica	31	(2)
- * Club domestic league appearances and goals as of 17:10, 21 November 2026 (UTC) ‡ National team caps and goals as of 07:10, 1 April 2026 (UTC)

Amari'i Kyren Bell (born 5 May 1994) is a professional footballer is a left back who plays for EFL Championship club Charlton Athletic and the Jamaica national team.

Bell joined Birmingham City's Academy in 2011 and turned professional the following year. He spent time on loan at Conference Premier club Nuneaton Town in the first half of the 2013–14 season before making his Football League debut for Birmingham in January 2014. Later that season he returned to the Conference Premier with Kidderminster Harriers. After a loan spell at League Two club Mansfield Town at the start of the 2014–15 season was cut short, Bell spent three months with League One club Swindon Town before joining another League One club, Gillingham, also on loan, in March 2015. He was released by Birmingham at the end of the 2014–15 season and signed for Fleetwood Town of League One. He spent two and a half seasons with Fleetwood, making 137 appearances, before moving on to Blackburn Rovers in January 2018. After three and a half seasons, 99 appearances, and a promotion to the Championship, he signed for Luton Town in 2021 and helped them gain promotion to the Premier League in 2023.

He was released by Luton Town following the conclusion of the 2024–25 campaign.

Bell was born in England and has played international football for Jamaica, for which he qualifies by descent. He represented Jamaica at the 2021 and 2023 CONCACAF Gold Cups and the 2024 Copa América.

== Life and club career ==
=== Early life and career ===
Bell was born in Burton upon Trent, Staffordshire, and raised in the Quinton district of Birmingham, where he attended Four Dwellings High School. As a youngster he was in the youth system at West Bromwich Albion before moving on to Solihull Moors, and he joined Birmingham City's academy in 2011. In June 2012, Bell signed a one-year professional contract. He played regularly for the development squad during the 2012–13 season, and was rewarded with another one-year contract, with the option of a further year.

In July 2013, Bell joined Conference Premier club Nuneaton Town on loan until the following January. He made his debut in the opening match of the season, a 1–0 win at Macclesfield Town, playing at left wing-back. According to the local newspaper, he "shone", though the player himself was more critical, recognising the need to minimise errors such as "a bit at the end where I took a poor touch and they could have scored from it." He kept his place in the starting eleven as Nuneaton went unbeaten for the first nine matches, apart from one match missed with a dead leg, but was suddenly recalled by his parent club on 20 September.

=== First-team debut with Birmingham City ===
Bell was given a squad number, and was considered for a defensive role ahead of Birmingham's third round League Cup match against Swansea City on 25 September, with Kyle Bartley ineligible and David Murphy rested after returning only recently from long-term injury. He played no part in the match, not even as an unused substitute, and returned to Nuneaton a couple of days later. Bell re-established himself at left back, playing a further eleven times in the Conference Premier and once in the FA Cup, before Birmingham recalled him again on 9 December after starting left-back Mitch Hancox damaged a knee and with Murphy again unfit.

He was included among the substitutes for Birmingham's next match, a 2–0 win away to AFC Bournemouth, but remained unused. Bell made his first-team debut on 28 January 2014, starting at left back against Championship leaders Leicester City as a late replacement for Hancox who had injured an ankle. He played the whole of the 2–1 defeat.

=== More loan spells ===
That was his last first-team appearance before he joined Conference Premier club Kidderminster Harriers on 6 March 2014, on a youth loan until the end of the season. For the second time that season, he made his club debut in a win against Macclesfield, on this occasion as a stoppage-time substitute as Kidderminster held on to a 2–1 lead. On 15 April, he scored his first goal in senior football to open the scoring in a 2–0 win against Cambridge United.

Ahead of the 2014–15 season, Bell signed for League Two club Mansfield Town on loan until January 2015, but was recalled only three matches into the campaign having failed to get any playing time. On 26 September 2014, he joined Swindon Town of League One on a youth loan until 3 January 2015. He hoped to regain self-belief by playing matches as part of a confident team, and went straight into the starting eleven for Swindon's 3–0 win away to Barnsley. Bell started six matches during October, displacing Liverpool loanee Brad Smith, but then lost his place to another loanee, Harry Toffolo, and for the remainder of his time with the club was used mainly as a late substitute or not at all.

In March 2015, Bell joined League One Gillingham on loan until the end of the season. He went straight into the starting eleven in place of the injured Joe Martin for the match against Colchester United, which Gillingham drew 2–2, and started the next five matches, but then lost his place and made only one more appearance, as a very late substitute.

=== Fleetwood Town ===
Birmingham decided not to take up their option of a further year on Bell's contract, and confirmed he would be released. Despite reported interest from Gillingham, Bell agreed to join League One club Fleetwood Town on 1 July 2015 after the expiry of his Birmingham contract. He went straight into the side at left wing back. In his fourth match, a 4–3 win away to Bury, he provided the assist for his fellow wing-back Tyler Hornby-Forbes' first Football League goal, and in the following match, he set up two goals in a 4–0 defeat of Colchester United. Assistant manager Chris Lucketti was impressed with both Bell and Hornby-Forbes: "with their athleticism, their attitude, their will to win and the running power they have they were different class – it turned the tide in our favour."

Fleetwood form and results dipped, Graham Alexander was replaced as manager by Steven Pressley, and Bell himself was struggling: after a home defeat against Chesterfield at the end of October, the Blackpool Gazette wrote that "Bell's shortcomings at left back are becoming more difficult to ignore", while Pressley said he needed more self-belief. He helped Fleetwood reach the Northern Final of the Football League Trophy, but missed his penalty as they lost to Barnsley in a shootout. By March 2016, Pressley was suggesting that Bell had the attributes to play at the top level, highlighting his pace, athleticism and ability in a one-to-one situation but also his need to work on crossing, an issue raised by the player himself early in the season. He made 51 appearances in all competitions as Fleetwood narrowly avoided relegation to League Two, and was one of a four-man shortlist for the club's Young Player of the Year awards, but lost out to Ashley Hunter.

He missed some of the 2016–17 pre-season with a hamstring problem, but that did not prevent Bell becoming a first-team regular under yet another new manager, Uwe Rösler. Being used at wing-back rather than full-back helped his attacking ambitions, and he scored his first goal for Fleetwood in his 71st match, an FA Cup replay against Southport on 15 November 2016, and his second in the league the following week. In the January 2017 transfer window, there was interest in Bell from clubs including Brighton & Hove Albion, Crystal Palace and West Ham United. Rösler said that Bell had added consistency to his game, and would do better staying at Fleetwood until at least the end of the season, "to reach another level. He does not want to go to a football club and be a sub. He wants to be bought for a lot of money and go right in there as their left-back." He did stay, and contributed a late equaliser against Charlton that kept Fleetwood's run going on its way to 18 matches unbeaten. He ended the season with 53 appearances, taking his total for Fleetwood to 104, as they reached and lost to Bradford City in the play-offs.

=== Blackburn Rovers ===
Bell's Fleetwood contract was due to expire at the end of the 2017–18 season, and he was unlikely to sign a new one. In the January transfer window, Fleetwood agreed terms for his transfer to another League One club, Blackburn Rovers, and the player signed on 19 January 2018 on a two-and-a-half-year contract. The fee was undisclosed, but understood by Sky Sports to be in the region of £300,000. He contributed to their promotion to and establishment in the Championship over what became a three-and-a-half-year stay, during which he made 99 appearances in all competitions. Bell left Blackburn Rovers when his contract expired at the end of the 2020–21 season.

=== Luton Town ===
Bell agreed a contract with another Championship club, Luton Town, to begin on 1 July 2021 when he became a free agent.

On 9 May 2025, the club announced Bell would be released in June when his contract expired.

=== Charlton Athletic ===
On 4 July 2025, Bell joined Charlton Athletic on a two-year deal.

== International career ==
In May 2019, Bell received an invitation to play for the Jamaican national team, ahead to team selection for the 2019 CONCACAF Gold Cup in July, but he withdrew through injury. He qualified for Jamaica because his grandparents are from that country.

In March 2021 he was one of six uncapped English-born players to receive a call-up. This time, he was able to accept, and made his debut in the starting eleven for the friendly against the United States in Austria on 25 March 2021. He played the whole match, which Jamaica lost 4–1. He was a member of the squad for the 2021 CONCACAF Gold Cup, and played in all three group matches, but not in the quarter-final defeat by the United States.

Bell scored his first international goal on 9 July 2023 in a 1–0 win over Guatemala in the quarterfinals of the 2023 CONCACAF Gold Cup.

== Career statistics ==
=== Club ===
As of match played 21 November 2026

Appearances and goals by club, season and competition
Club	Season	League			FA Cup		League Cup		Other		Total	
Club	Season	Division	Apps	Goals	Apps	Goals	Apps	Goals	Apps	Goals	Apps	Goals
Birmingham City	2013–14	Championship	1	0	—		0	0	—		1	0
Birmingham City	2014–15	Championship	0	0	0	0	0	0	—		0	0
Birmingham City	Total		1	0	0	0	0	0	—		1	0
Nuneaton Town (loan)	2013–14	Conference Premier	19	0	1	0	—		0	0	20	0
Kidderminster Harriers (loan)	2013–14	Conference Premier	10	2	—		—		—		10	2
Mansfield Town (loan)	2014–15	League Two	0	0	—		0	0	—		0	0
Swindon Town (loan)	2014–15	League One	10	0	0	0	—		1 (Note: Appearance(s) in Football League Trophy)	0	11	0
Gillingham (loan)	2014–15	League One	7	0	—		—		—		7	0
Fleetwood Town	2015–16	League One	44	0	1	0	1	0	5	0	51	0
Fleetwood Town	2016–17	League One	44	2	6	1	1	0	2 (Note: Appearances in League One play-offs)	0	53	3
Fleetwood Town	2017–18	League One	27	4	5	0	0	0	1 (Note: Appearance in EFL Trophy)	0	33	4
Fleetwood Town	Total		115	6	12	1	2	0	8	0	137	7
Blackburn Rovers	2017–18	League One	12	0	—		—		—		12	0
Blackburn Rovers	2018–19	Championship	38	3	2	0	3	0	—		43	3
Blackburn Rovers	2019–20	Championship	21	0	1	0	0	0	—		22	0
Blackburn Rovers	2020–21	Championship	19	0	1	0	2	0	—		22	0
Blackburn Rovers	Total		90	3	4	0	5	0	—		99	3
Luton Town	2021–22	Championship	41	1	3	0	0	0	2 (Note: Appearances in Championship play-offs)	0	46	1
Luton Town	2022–23	Championship	44	1	4	0	0	0	3	0	51	1
Luton Town	2023–24	Premier League	21	0	4	0	2	0	—		27	0
Luton Town	2024–25	Championship	31	0	1	0	1	0	—		33	0
Luton Town	Total		137	2	12	0	3	0	5	0	157	2
Charlton Athletic	2025–26	Championship	34	0	1	0	0	0	—		35	0
Charlton Athletic	2026–27	Championship	12	0	0	0	1	0	—		13	0
Charlton Athletic	Total		46	0	1	0	1	0	0	0	48	0
Career total			435	13	30	1	11	0	14	0	490	14

=== International ===
As of match played 31 March 2026

Appearances and goals by national team and year
National team	Year	Apps	Goals
Jamaica	2021	5	0
Jamaica	2022	3	0
Jamaica	2023	9	1
Jamaica	2024	4	0
Jamaica	2025	8	1
Jamaica	2026	2	0
Total		31	2

Scores and results list Jamaica's goal tally first, score column indicates score after each Bell goal.

List of international goals scored by Amari'i Bell
No.	Date	Venue	Opponent	Score	Result	Competition
1	9 July 2023	TQL Stadium, Cincinnati, United States	Guatemala	1–0	1–0	2023 CONCACAF Gold Cup
2	24 June 2025	Q2 Stadium, Austin, United States	Panama	1–2	1–4	2025 CONCACAF Gold Cup

== Honours ==
Blackburn Rovers

- EFL League One second-place promotion: 2017–18

Luton Town

- EFL Championship play-offs: 2023

Individual

- PFA Team of the Year: 2017–18 League One
