= Nick Haughton =

English footballer (born 1994)

Personal information
- Full name: Nicholas George Haughton
- Date of birth: 20 September 1994 (age 32)
- Place of birth: Urmston, England
- Height: 5 ft 10 in (1.78 m)
- Position: Midfielder

Team information
- Current team: Forest Green Rovers
- Number: 8

Youth career
- –2013: Bolton Wanderers

Senior career*
Years	Team	Apps	(Gls)
2013	Curzon Ashton	2	(0)
2013	Trafford		
2013–2014	Runcorn Town	16	(3)
2014–2018	Fleetwood Town	40	(1)
2014	→ Nantwich Town (loan)		
2016	→ Salford City (loan)	3	(1)
2017	→ Salford City (loan)	13	(2)
2017	→ Chorley (loan)	17	(7)
2018	Salford City	23	(3)
2018–2025	AFC Fylde	240	(99)
2025–	Forest Green Rovers	26	(5)
- * Club domestic league appearances and goals as of 20:16, 26 February 2026 (UTC)

Nicholas George Haughton (born 20 September 1994) is an English professional footballer who plays as a midfielder for National League club Forest Green Rovers.

== Career ==
After being released from Bolton Wanderers, Haughton joined Curzon Ashton FC. Haughton then went on to shine for Trafford FC's scholars which earned him a call up for England Schools. He subsequently began his playing career in the North West Counties League with Runcorn Town. After a trial at Middlesbrough FC, He joined Fleetwood Town in February 2014 following a trial, and was immediately loaned out to Nantwich Town of the Northern Premier League. He signed a new contract with Fleetwood in September 2014 to keep him tied to the club until 2017. He made his debut for the "Cod Army" in the Football League on 4 October 2014, coming on for Antoni Sarcevic 68 minutes into a 1–0 win over Port Vale at Highbury Stadium.

In November 2016 he joined Salford City on a loan deal that expired on 8 January 2017, but was recalled on 12 December. On 31 January 2017, he returned to Salford on a loan until the end of the season.

On 31 August 2017, he joined National League North club Chorley on loan until the end of the season. He was recalled from this loan on 15 January 2018, having scored 13 goals in 25 matches for Chorley.

On 18 January 2018, he joined Salford City for an undisclosed fee, signing on a two-and-a-half-year deal.

In late October 2018 he moved to AFC Fylde. The 2022–23 season saw Fylde promoted as National League North Champions with Haughton finishing the season as the division's top goalscorer, winning the Player of the Season award. On 22 May 2023, Haughton signed a two-year deal with Fylde, with the option of a further year.

On 6 August 2025, Haughton returned to the National League following AFC Fylde's relegation, joining Forest Green Rovers for an undisclosed fee.

== Personal life ==
Haughton is currently dating former New Zealand international Laura Merrin.

== Career statistics ==
As of end of 2024–25 season

Appearances and goals by club, season and competition
Club	Season	League			FA Cup		League Cup		Other		Total	
Club	Season	Division	Apps	Goals	Apps	Goals	Apps	Goals	Apps	Goals	Apps	Goals
Fleetwood Town	2014–15	League One	22	1	0	0	0	0	0	0	22	1
Fleetwood Town	2015–16	League One	18	0	1	0	0	0	5 (Note: Appearance(s) in the Football League Trophy)	0	24	0
Fleetwood Town	2016–17	League One	0	0	0	0	0	0	0	0	0	0
Fleetwood Town	2017–18	League One	0	0	—		0	0	0	0	0	0
Fleetwood Town	Total		40	1	1	0	0	0	5	0	46	1
Salford City (loan)	2016–17	National League North	16	3	—		—		3 (Note: Two appearances in FA Trophy, one appearance in National League North play-offs)	0	19	3
Chorley (loan)	2017–18	National League North	17	7	4	4	—		2 (Note: Appearances in FA Trophy)	0	23	11
Salford City	2017–18	National League North	15	3	—		—		—		15	3
Salford City	2018–19	National League	8	0	0	0	—		—		8	0
Salford City	Total		23	3	0	0	0	0	0	0	23	3
AFC Fylde	2018–19	National League	30	2	—		—		11 (Note: Eight appearances and two goals in FA Trophy, three appearances in National League play-offs)	2	41	4
AFC Fylde	2019–20	National League	28	2	3	1	—		3	4	34	7
AFC Fylde	2020–21	National League North	11	6	4	2	—		0	0	15	8
AFC Fylde	2021–22	National League North	41	26	2	1	—		3	0	46	27
AFC Fylde	2022–23	National League North	42	26	7	7	—		2	1	51	34
AFC Fylde	2023–24	National League	43	18	2	0	—		2	0	47	18
AFC Fylde	2024–25	National League	45	19	1	0	—		1	1	47	20
AFC Fylde	Total		240	99	19	11	0	0	22	8	281	118
Career total			336	113	24	15	0	0	32	8	392	136

== Honours ==
AFC Fylde

- National League North: 2022–23
- FA Trophy: 2018–19

Individual

- National League North Player of the Month: August/September 2021, September 2022
- National League North Player of the Year: 2022–23
- National League North Team of the Season: 2021–22, 2022–23
- National League Team of the Season: 2024–25
