= Stephen Jordan (footballer) =

English footballer and physiotherapist

Personal information
- Full name: Stephen Robert Jordan
- Date of birth: 6 March 1982 (age 44)
- Place of birth: Warrington, England
- Height: 6 ft 0 in (1.83 m)
- Position: Defender

Team information
- Current team: Salford City (Physiotherapist)

Youth career
- –1999: Manchester City

Senior career*
Years	Team	Apps	(Gls)
1999–2007	Manchester City	53	(0)
2002–2003	→ Cambridge United (loan)	11	(0)
2007–2010	Burnley	73	(0)
2010–2011	Sheffield United	15	(0)
2011	→ Huddersfield Town (loan)	6	(0)
2011–2012	Rochdale	19	(0)
2012–2013	Dunfermline Athletic	20	(1)
2013–2016	Fleetwood Town	73	(1)
2016–2019	Chorley	79	(1)
Total		349	(3)
- * Club domestic league appearances and goals

Stephen Robert Jordan (born 6 March 1982) is an English former footballer and team physiotherapist at League Two side Salford City.

As a player he was a defender and notably played in the Premier League for Manchester City where he was part of the first team squad from 1999 until 2007. He went on to play for Burnley, Sheffield United, Huddersfield Town and Fleetwood Town amongst others. He retired in 2019 after three seasons playing with non-league side Chorley.

== Career ==
=== Manchester City ===
Born in Warrington, Jordan grew up as a Manchester City fan and joined their youth development system as an eight-year-old. In 2000, he became part of the youth academy going on to sign for the first team 2 years later.

During his first two seasons at Manchester City, Jordan failed to make any first team starts and as a result was loaned out to then Football League Two side Cambridge United in October 2002 for 3 months. He made his debut for the club on the same day, playing the full ninety minutes of a 2–2 draw with Wrexham at the Abbey Stadium. He went on to make a total of 11 appearances with the side and returned to Manchester in January 2003. He made his first team debut for Manchester City in the same year coming on as a late substitute against Bolton Wanderers at the start of April.

In the summer of 2004, Peterborough United made an offer for Jordan who was out of contract at Manchester City, as he was under 24 at the time Peterborough would have been required to pay compensation to Manchester City under the Bosman ruling. Kevin Keegan, the then City boss, said that he hoped Jordan would sign a new contract and remain with the club. A fortnight later City revealed that Jordan had signed a 12-month extension to his contract and would remain at the club until 2005. Peterborough then contacted Manchester City with the hope of loaning the player as cover for their injured defender Sagi Burton, Keegan agreed to the loan but Jordan did not want to go as he felt he was close to breaking into the first team at City.

The following season Jordan did break into the first team, making 19 Premier League starts in the later stages of the season and as the player was only on a 12-month contract his new manager, Stuart Pearce urged the player to "commit his future" to the club. Jordan finally committed his future to the club at the end of May 2005 when he signed a two-year-long contract with City. However, over the next two seasons at City, Jordan made fewer and fewer appearances, starting just 30 league games, and was released when his contract expired in 2007.

=== Burnley ===
In July 2007 it was announced that Burnley of the Football Championship had signed Jordan on a 3-year deal. In May 2010, Jordan was released by Burnley after three injury-filled seasons with the club.

=== Sheffield United ===
Following his release, Jordan had a trial with Portsmouth even joining them on their US pre-season tour, but he decided against a move to Fratton Park in favour of joining Sheffield United on a one-year contract. Jordan continued to be prone to injuries throughout the following season and failed to cement himself in a struggling Blades side. After being told by recently appointed Blades boss Micky Adams that he was not in his long-term plans, Jordan joined Huddersfield Town on an emergency one-month loan in February 2011, following injuries to their regular left-backs Gary Naysmith and Liam Ridehalgh. He made his début the same day in Town's 2–2 draw with Leyton Orient at the Galpharm Stadium. He would make 5 further appearances for the Terriers before returning to Sheffield in March, after Naysmith and Ridehalgh had returned to the squad. With no prospect of further first team football at Bramall Lane his contract with Sheffield United was terminated by mutual consent on at the start of April 2011 after playing only 15 times for the South Yorkshire club.

=== Rochdale ===
After a trial with League Two side Rotherham United, Stephen Jordan joined League One side Rochdale on non-contract terms on 28 October 2011. He played in every game and thanked the club for not only giving him another chance to enjoy playing football, but also signing him in the first place. It went even better for Jordan as he was rewarded with a permanent 18-month deal at the club on 22 December 2011. After signing a new contract, Jordan continued to play in the first team, though his first team place was soon reduced, having been on the bench. On 10 March 2012, Jordan performance in a 2–2 draw against Huddersfield Town was praised by Manager John Coleman, commenting "ran himself into the ground until he could run no more." He since made no appearance for the remainder of the 2011–12 season and it went worse as the club was relegated to League Two.

At the start of the 2012–13 season, Jordan was released by Rochdale on 27 July 2012.

=== Dunfermline Athletic ===
Jordan joined Scottish Premier League recent relegated side Dunfermline Athletic, having joined the club on trial. Jordan made his debut against Cowdenbeath on 11 August 2012. Thirty-One days later, on 15 September 2012, Jordan scored his first goal of his career, scoring from six yards, in a 2–0 win over Dumbarton. However, Jordan made twenty-appearance for the club and played less due to injuries.

In the wake Dunfermline Athletic administration, it was announced by administrator Bryan Jackson that Jordan was among seven players made redundant and find a new club.

=== Fleetwood Town ===
Following his release from Dunfermline Athletic, Jordan returned to England by joining League Two Fleetwood Town on 12 July 2013. In July 2014, he signed a new one-year contract with the club, and again signed a new one-year contract in May 2015. He was released in summer 2016. On 14 June 2016 he signed for Conference North side Chorley.

== Personal life ==
Jordan attended Birchwood Community High School in Warrington. In July 2017 he graduated from the University of Salford with a degree in physiotherapy as part of a scheme between the university and the Professional Footballers Association aimed at preparing current and former footballers for careers after football.

== Career statistics ==
Appearances and goals by club, season and competition
Club	Season	League			FA Cup		League Cup		Other		Total	
Club	Season	Division	Apps	Goals	Apps	Goals	Apps	Goals	Apps	Goals	Apps	Goals
Manchester City	1998–99	Second Division	0	0	0	0	0	0	0	0	0	0
Manchester City	1999–2000	First Division	0	0	0	0	0	0	—		0	0
Manchester City	2000–01	Premier League	0	0	0	0	0	0	—		0	0
Manchester City	2001–02	First Division	0	0	0	0	0	0	—		0	0
Manchester City	2002–03	Premier League	1	0	0	0	0	0	—		1	0
Manchester City	2003–04	Premier League	2	0	0	0	0	0	0	0	2	0
Manchester City	2004–05	Premier League	19	0	0	0	2	0	—		21	0
Manchester City	2005–06	Premier League	18	0	5	0	1	0	—		24	0
Manchester City	2006–07	Premier League	13	0	2	0	1	0	—		16	0
Manchester City	Total		53	0	7	0	4	0	0	0	64	0
Cambridge United (loan)	2002–03	Third Division	11	0	0	0	0	0	3 (Note: Appearances in the Football League Trophy)	0	14	0
Burnley	2007–08	Championship	21	0	0	0	3	0	—		24	0
Burnley	2008–09	Championship	27	0	1	0	6	0	0	0	34	0
Burnley	2009–10	Premier League	25	0	0	0	0	0	—		25	0
Burnley	Total		73	0	1	0	9	0	0	0	83	0
Sheffield United	2010–11	Championship	15	0	0	0	0	0	—		15	0
Huddersfield Town (loan)	2010–11	League One	6	0	0	0	0	0	0	0	6	0
Rochdale	2011–12	League One	19	0	1	0	0	0	1	0	21	0
Dunfermline Athletic	2012–13	Scottish First Division	20	1	1	0	2	0	0	0	23	1
Fleetwood Town	2013–14	League Two	10	0	0	0	1	0	0	0	11	0
Fleetwood Town	2014–15	League One	42	1	1	0	1	0	0	0	44	1
Fleetwood Town	2015–16	League One	21	0	0	0	1	0	0	0	22	0
Fleetwood Town	Total		73	1	1	0	3	0	0	0	77	1
Chorley	2016–17	National League North	32	1	0	0	—		3 (Note: One appearance in FA Trophy; two appearances in National League North play-offs)	0	35	1
Chorley	2017–18	National League North	27	0	3	0	—		0	0	30	0
Chorley	2018–19	National League North	20	0	1	0	—		0	0	21	0
Chorley	Total		79	1	4	0	—		3	0	86	1
Career total			349	3	15	0	18	0	7	0	389	3

== Honours ==
Fleetwood Town

- Football League Two play-offs: 2014
