= Nathan Pond =

English footballer

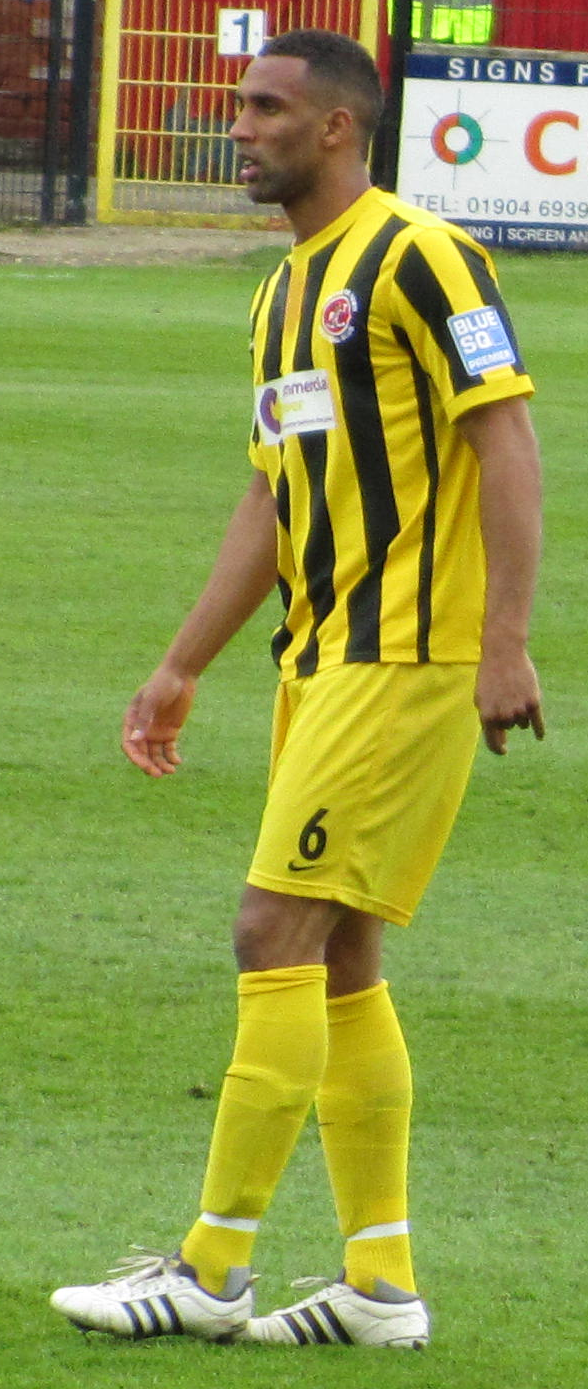
- Pond playing for Fleetwood Town in April 2012

Personal information
- Full name: Nathan Louis Pond
- Date of birth: 5 January 1985 (age 41)
- Place of birth: Preston, England
- Height: 1.90 m (6 ft 3 in)
- Position: Defender

Team information
- Current team: Fleetwood Town (assistant head coach)

Senior career*
Years	Team	Apps	(Gls)
2002–2003	Lancaster City		
2003–2018	Fleetwood Town	460	(52)
2010	→ Kendal Town (loan)	2	(0)
2012–2013	→ Grimsby Town (loan)	26	(5)
2018–2020	Salford City	65	(2)
2020–2021	AFC Fylde	9	(0)
2021	AFC Telford United	3	(0)
2021–2023	Bamber Bridge	59	(6)
2023–2025	Fleetwood Town	0	(0)
2024	→ Bamber Bridge (loan)	1	(0)
2024	→ Kendal Town (loan)	0	(0)
2024–2025	→ Bamber Bridge (loan)	4	(0)

International career^{‡}
2019–2023	Montserrat	13	(2)
- * Club domestic league appearances and goals as of 01:35, 22 November 2024 (UTC) ‡ National team caps and goals as of 08:15, 30 March 2023 (UTC)

Nathan Louis Pond (born 5 January 1985) is a retired professional footballer who played as a defender or defensive midfielder. He is currently assistant head coach at Fleetwood Town.

He has previously played for Fleetwood Town over a fifteen-year period, whilst also having spells with Lancaster City, Kendal Town, Grimsby Town, Salford City, AFC Fylde and AFC Telford United. Internationally, he represents Montserrat, earning his first caps in 2019.

Having played in seven divisions for Fleetwood through the course of six promotions, Pond was recognised by Guinness as holding the world record for appearing in the most different divisions with a single football club.

== Club career ==
=== Early career and Fleetwood Town ===
Pond began his career with Northern Premier League side Lancaster City in 2003. Later that year he transferred to Fleetwood Town.

Pond was the club's current longest-serving player, having played a club record of 498 matches since 2003, including six promotions, most notably the club's promotion to the Football League in 2012.

He joined Kendal Town on a month's loan in December 2010, making two appearances for the club. The loan was part of an agreement, due to the sale of Danny Rowe to Fleetwood.

On 10 August 2012, Pond joined Grimsby Town on an initial one-month loan. Having made his first appearance on 11 August against Southport at centre back, during the following game on 14 August he scored the opening goal in the 69th minute in the 2–1 home defeat against Stockport, a right-footed overhead kick in off the crossbar. After playing three times for Grimsby, Pond extended his loan stay until January 2013. On 8 September, he scored his second goal for Grimsby in a 1–0 victory against Forest Green Rovers, a glancing header from a Frankie Artus free-kick.

Following a successful loan spell, Grimsby looked into extending Pond's loan beyond January or possibly securing him on a permanent deal but on 1 January 2013 they admitted it was unlikely because Fleetwood were interested in taking the player back to look at him. Pond's final appearance for Grimsby in his loan spell brought his fifth goal of the season against Hereford United, two minutes into the game. Pond commented before his final game that the loan spell had been successful for both himself and the club and that he would relish the prospect of returning to Grimsby on a permanent deal in the January transfer window if he was unable to win back his place in the Fleetwood team.

After signing a new contract in May 2015, Pond was named captain of Fleetwood. He signed new one-year contracts in both June 2016, and January 2017, the latter with the option for an additional year.

He passed Jack Ainscough's record of 421 appearances for Fleetwood in the penultimate game of the 2015–16 season, ending the season on 423 appearances.

Fleetwood exercised a one-year contract extension for him at the end of the 2017–18 season.

=== Later career ===
In May 2018 he joined National League team Salford City, where he was reunited with Graham Alexander.

He was released on 16 May 2020.

On 7 August 2020 he joined AFC Fylde following his release from Salford. Having been made club captain, he made his debut on the opening day of the season, keeping a clean sheet in a 1–0 win over Darlington on 6 October. He was released from his contract in May 2021, with manager Jim Bentley saying it was his toughest decision as Fylde manager. Pond joined AFC Telford United in July 2021, Telford manager Gavin Cowan described the initial offer to Pond as "tongue-in-cheek", believing he would not sign, but said Pond had ambitions of another promotion in his career.

Pond became a coach at his former club Fleetwood Town in September 2021, joining on the PFA Player to Coach scheme.

Pond was released by Telford on 30 September, following a 'wild challenge' that saw him earn a red card in an FA Cup tie with Stamford, with Cowan describing it as 'completely unacceptable' and that he 'couldn't stand by Pond'.

On 6 October, he signed for Bamber Bridge. He spent two seasons with the club, leaving at the end of the 2022-23 season.

For the 2023-24 season, Pond registered as a player at Fleetwood, where he would compete in development squad games as an over-age player alongside coaching. Following the departure of Scott Brown as manager, Pond assisted caretaker manager Matt Lawlor before the appointment of Lee Johnson as the club's new manager.

== International career ==
Pond was called up for Montserrat in October 2019 and made his debut on 13 October, playing 90 minutes against El Salvador. He scored his first goal in a 1–0 victory against St Lucia to ensure Montserrat progress to 2021 CONCACAF Gold Cup qualification.

== Career statistics ==
=== Club ===
As of match played 17 August 2024

Club	Season	League			FA Cup		League Cup		Other		Total	
Club	Season	Division	Apps	Goals	Apps	Goals	Apps	Goals	Apps	Goals	Apps	Goals
Fleetwood Town	2006–07	NPL Premier Division			1	0	---				1	0
Fleetwood Town	2007–08	NPL Premier Division			0	0	---				0	0
Fleetwood Town	2008–09	Conference North			2	0	---				2	0
Fleetwood Town	2009–10	Conference North			1	0	---				1	0
Fleetwood Town	2010–11	Conference Premier	23	2	1	0	---		0	0	24	2
Fleetwood Town	2011–12	Conference Premier	34	1	4	0	---		0	0	34	1
Fleetwood Town	2012–13	League Two	12	0	0	0	0	0	0	0	12	0
Fleetwood Town	2013–14	League Two	41	1	2	0	0	0	8 (Note: Five appearances in the Football League Trophy and three in the League Two play-offs)	1	51	2
Fleetwood Town	2014–15	League One	27	1	1	0	1	0	0	0	29	1
Fleetwood Town	2015–16	League One	21	0	1	0	0	0	4 (Note: Appearances in the Football League Trophy)	0	29	0
Fleetwood Town	2016–17	League One	32	0	5	0	1	0	1 (Note: Appearance in the League One play-offs)	0	39	0
Fleetwood Town	2017–18	League One	30	0	4	0	0	0	2	0	36	0
Fleetwood Town	Total		220	5	22	0	2	0	15	1	259	6
Grimsby Town (loan)	2012–13	Conference Premier	26	0	5	0	0	0	---		31	0
Salford City	2018–19	National League	43	2	2	0	0	0	---		45	2
Salford City	2019–20	League Two	22	0	1	0	1	0	3	0	27	0
Salford City	Total		65	2	3	0	1	0	3	0	72	2
Telford United	2021–22	National League North	3	0	---		---		---		3	0
Bamber Bridge	2021–22	NPL Premier Division	24	3	---		---		---		24	3
Bamber Bridge	2022–23	NPL Premier Division	33	3	---		---		---		33	3
Bamber Bridge (loan)	2023–24	NPL Premier Division	1	0	---		---		---		1	0
Kendal Town (loan)	2024–25	Northern League Division One	0	0	1	0	---		---		1	0
Career total			372	13	26	0	3	0	18	1	419	14

=== International ===
As of match played 28 March 2023

Appearances and goals by national team and year
National team	Year	Apps	Goals
Montserrat	2019	4	1
Montserrat	2021	4	1
Montserrat	2022	3	0
Montserrat	2023	2	0
Total		13	2

Scores and results list Montserrat's goal tally first.

No.	Date	Venue	Opponent	Score	Result	Competition
1.	19 November 2019	Darren Sammy Cricket Ground, Gros Islet, Saint Lucia	Saint Lucia	1–0	1–0	2019–20 CONCACAF Nations League B
2.	2 June 2021	Estadio Panamericano, San Cristóbal, Dominican Republic	U.S. Virgin Islands	1–0	4–0	2022 FIFA World Cup qualification

== Honours ==
Fleetwood Town

- North West Counties Football League Division One: 2004–05
- Northern Premier League Division One runner-up: 2005–06
- Northern Premier League Premier Division: 2007–08
- Conference North play-offs: 2010
- Conference Premier: 2011–12
- Football League Two play-offs: 2014

Salford City

- National League play-offs: 2019
