= Thomas Grant (footballer) =

Scottish footballer (born 1995)

Personal information
- Full name: Thomas Grant
- Date of birth: 31 May 1995 (age 31)
- Place of birth: Aberdeen, Scotland
- Position: Midfielder

Senior career*
Years	Team	Apps	(Gls)
2012–2016	Falkirk	28	(1)
2015	→ Arbroath (loan)	11	(2)
2016–2017	Fleetwood Town	3	(0)
2017	Stenhousemuir	4	(1)
2017–2018	Alloa Athletic	0	(0)
- * Club domestic league appearances and goals as of 15:50, 10 July 2020 (UTC)

Thomas Grant (born 31 May 1995) is a Scottish footballer who plays as a midfielder, most recently for Alloa Athletic.

He is the son of former Aberdeen player Brian Grant.

== Career ==
Born in Aberdeen, Grant began his career at Falkirk. He made his debut on 10 November 2012, replacing Jonathan Flynn for the final four minutes of a 2–1 Scottish Football League Division One loss at Raith Rovers. He made 23 appearances in his first season, scoring the opening goal of a 2–0 win at Dumbarton on 23 February 2013. On 3 August 2013, he scored the final goal of Falkirk's 3–0 win over Clyde in the first round of the Scottish League Cup. For much of the 2013–14 season he suffered from the effects of a virus and was unable to play football, making only 8 appearances compared to 27 in the previous campaign.

In January 2015, Grant was loaned to Scottish League Two team Arbroath for the remainder of the season. He scored twice in eleven matches there: in a 3–1 loss at Berwick Rangers on 14 February, and a free kick in a 5–0 home win over the same team on 2 May which qualified the team for the promotion play-offs. After only 7 first-team appearances, Grant was released by Falkirk in January 2016.

On 5 March 2016, Grant signed for Fleetwood Town until the end of the 2015–16 season. Ten days later, he made his debut in Football League One, playing the entirety of a 0–1 loss to Walsall at Highbury Stadium. He was released by Fleetwood during the January 2017 transfer window. Grant signed a short-term contract with Scottish League One club Stenhousemuir in February 2017. He left Stenhousemuir at the end of the 2016–17 season, then signed for Alloa Athletic.

== Career statistics ==
As of match played 4 November 2017

Appearances and goals by club, season and competition
Club	Season	League			Scottish Cup		League Cup		Other		Total	
Club	Season	Division	Apps	Goals	Apps	Goals	Apps	Goals	Apps	Goals	Apps	Goals
Falkirk	2012–13	Championship	23	1	4	0	0	0	0	0	27	1
Falkirk	2013–14	Championship	4	0	0	0	1	1	3 (Note: Appearances in the Scottish Challenge Cup)	0	8	1
Falkirk	2014–15	Championship	1	0	0	0	0	0	0	0	1	0
Falkirk	Falkirk total		28	1	4	0	1	1	3	0	36	2
Arbroath	2014–15	League Two	11	2	0	0	0	0	1 (Note: Appearance in the League One play-offs)	0	12	2
Fleetwood Town	2015–16	EFL League One	3	0	0	0	0	0	0	0	3	0
Stenhousemuir	2016–17	League One	4	1	0	0	0	0	0	0	4	1
Alloa Athletic	2017–18	League One	0	0	0	0	3	0	1	0	4	0
Career total			46	4	4	0	4	1	5	0	59	5
