= Lyle Della-Verde =

English footballer

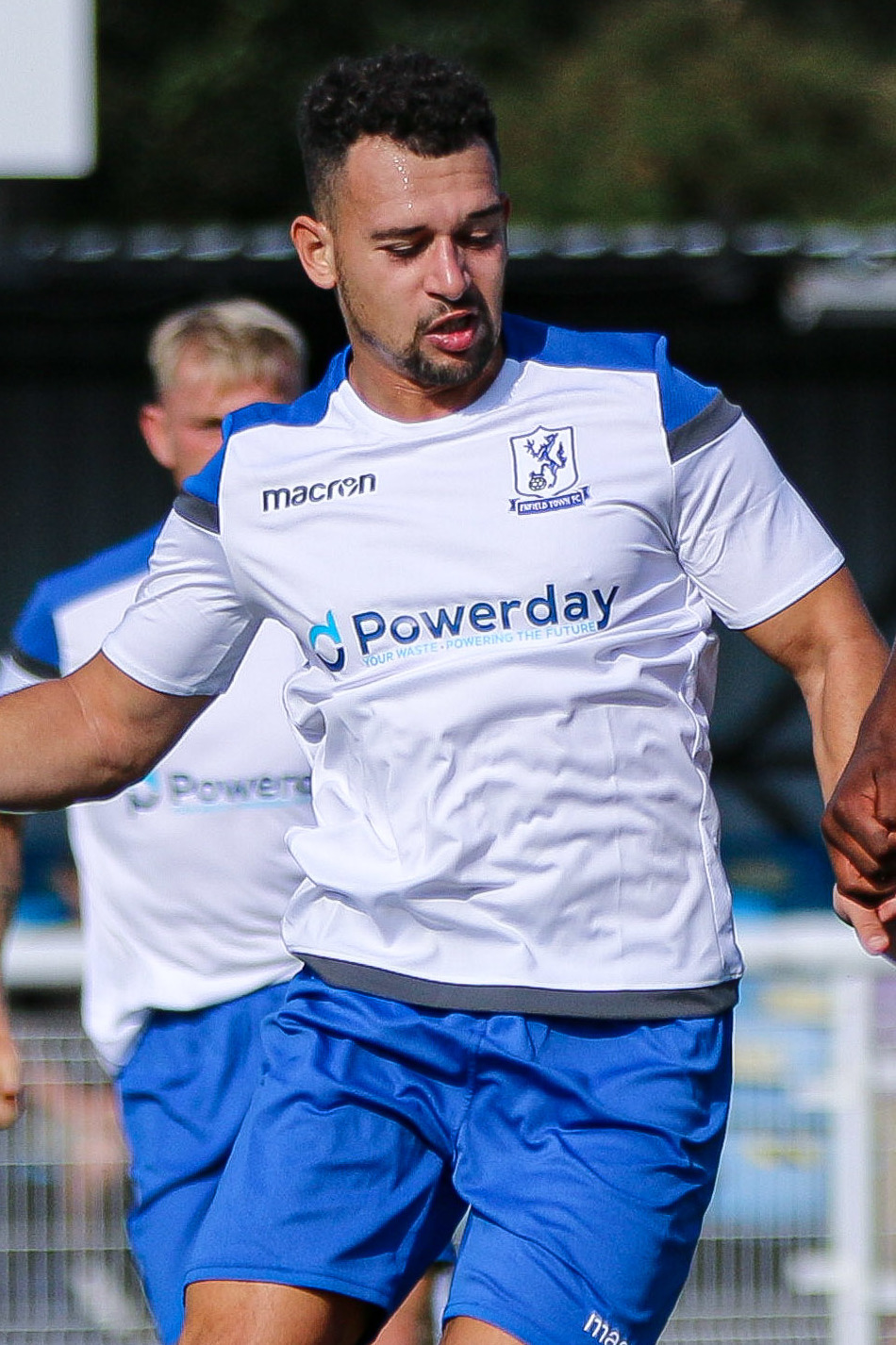
- Lyle Della-Verde playing for Enfield Town in September 2020

Personal information
- Full name: Lyle Della-Verde
- Date of birth: 9 January 1995 (age 31)
- Place of birth: Leeds, England
- Height: 1.75 m (5 ft 9 in)
- Position: Winger

Team information
- Current team: Phoenix Sports

Youth career
- Tottenham Hotspur
- 2007–2011: Southend United
- 2011–2014: Fulham

Senior career*
Years	Team	Apps	(Gls)
2014–2015	Fulham	0	(0)
2014	→ Bristol Rovers (loan)	7	(0)
2015–2016	Fleetwood Town	7	(0)
2016	Crawley Town	12	(0)
2016	Welling United	12	(1)
2016–2017	Concord Rangers	22	(3)
2017–2018	Dartford	28	(5)
2018–2019	Braintree Town	29	(3)
2019	Kingstonian	2	(0)
2019	Haringey Borough	7	(2)
2019	Hayes & Yeading United	13	(1)
2019–2020	Enfield Town	22	(7)
2020–2021	Welling United	12	(3)
2021–2023	Enfield Town	62	(17)
2023–2024	Cray Valley Paper Mills	33	(5)
2024–2025	Brentwood Town	26	(3)
2025–	Phoenix Sports	3	(1)
- * Club domestic league appearances and goals as of 13:29, 13 August 2025 (UTC)

Lyle Della-Verde (born 9 January 1995) is an English semi-professional footballer who plays as a winger for Southern Counties East League Premier Division club Phoenix Sports.

== Early and personal life ==
Della-Verde was born in Leeds.

== Career ==
After playing for Tottenham Hotspur, Della-Verde signed for Southend United in 2007. He signed for Fulham in mid-2011, turning professional on his 17th birthday in January 2012. He signed on loan for Bristol Rovers in November 2014 for an initial one-month period. The loan was extended in early December 2014, although it was cut short a week later after he suffered an ankle injury.

After being released by Fulham, he signed a two-year contract with Fleetwood Town in July 2015. He was released by Fleetwood in February 2016, signing a one-month contract with Crawley Town later that month. Della-Verde was released by Crawley Town at the end of the 2015–16 season, and signed for non-league Welling United in August 2016. He was released by Welling United on 19 November 2016. On 2 December 2016, he signed for Concord Rangers. He signed for Dartford in June 2017. At the end of the 2017–18 season – after Dartford missed out on promotion back to the National League – Della-Verde left the club.

On 29 June 2018, Della-Verde agreed to join newly promoted National League side Braintree Town. Della-Verde then joined Kingstonian in March 2019. After only two games, he joined Haringey Borough. Della-Verde lined up for Hayes & Yeading United on the opening day of the 2019–20 season. He joined Enfield Town in December 2019. Della-Verde re-joined Welling on dual registration when the Isthmian League season was suspended due to the second national lockdown in England. On 3 July 2023, he signed for Isthmian League South East Division club Cray Valley Paper Mills. He was released by the club in November 2024. On 2 December 2024, Della-Verde signed for Brentwood Town.

In July 2025, Della-Verde joined Phoenix Sports following their relegation to the Southern Counties East Premier Division.

== Career statistics ==
As of end of 2024–25 season

Appearances and goals by club, season and competition
Club	Season	League			FA Cup		League Cup		Other		Total	
Club	Season	Division	Apps	Goals	Apps	Goals	Apps	Goals	Apps	Goals	Apps	Goals
Fulham	2014–15	Championship	0	0	0	0	0	0	0	0	0	0
Bristol Rovers (loan)	2014–15	Conference Premier	7	0	1	0	—		0	0	8	0
Fleetwood Town	2015–16	League One	7	0	0	0	1	0	0	0	8	0
Crawley Town	2015–16	League Two	12	0	0	0	0	0	0	0	12	0
Welling United	2016–17	National League South	12	1	3	0	—		2	3	17	4
Concord Rangers	2016–17	National League South	22	3	0	0	—		0	0	22	3
Dartford	2017–18	National League South	28	5	3	0	—		3	0	34	5
Braintree Town	2018–19	National League	29	3	1	1	—		0	0	30	4
Kingstonian	2018–19	Isthmian League Premier Division	2	0	0	0	—		0	0	2	0
Haringey Borough	2018–19	Isthmian League Premier Division	7	2	0	0	—		0	0	7	2
Hayes & Yeading United	2019–20	SFL Premier Division South	13	1	0	0	—		0	0	13	1
Enfield Town	2019–20	Isthmian League Premier Division	13	4	0	0	—		2	0	15	4
Enfield Town	2020–21	Isthmian League Premier Division	9	3	1	0	—		1	2	11	5
Enfield Town	Total		22	7	1	0	0	0	3	2	26	9
Welling United	2020–21	National League South	10	3	0	0	—		0	0	10	3
Welling United	2021–22	National League South	2	0	0	0	—		0	0	2	0
Welling United	Total		12	3	0	0	0	0	0	0	12	3
Enfield Town	2021–22	Isthmian League Premier Division	31	10	2	0	—		4 (Note: Three appearances, two goals in FA Trophy and one appearance in Isthmian League Premier play-offs)	2	37	12
Enfield Town	2022–23	Isthmian League Premier Division	31	7	1	0	—		1 (Note: Appearance(s) in FA Trophy)	0	33	7
Enfield Town	Total		62	17	3	0	0	0	5	2	70	19
Cray Valley Paper Mills	2023–24	Isthmian League South East Division	23	5	2	0	—		0	0	25	5
Cray Valley Paper Mills	2024–25	Isthmian League Premier Division	10	0	2	0	—		4 (Note: Two appearances in Kent Senior Cup, one appearance in FA Trophy, one appearance in Alan Turvey Trophy)	0	16	0
Cray Valley Paper Mills	Total		33	5	4	0	0	0	4	0	41	5
Brentwood Town	2024–25	Isthmian League North Division	26	3	0	0	—		0	0	26	3
Career total			307	53	16	1	1	0	17	7	341	61
