= Tyler Hornby-Forbes =

English footballer

Personal information
- Full name: Tyler Cecil Hornby-Forbes
- Date of birth: 8 March 1996 (age 30)
- Place of birth: Preston, England
- Height: 1.78 m (5 ft 10 in)
- Positions: Right-back; right winger

Youth career
- –2014: Preston North End

Senior career*
Years	Team	Apps	(Gls)
2014–2016	Fleetwood Town	33	(2)
2016–2018	Brighton & Hove Albion	0	(0)
2017–2018	→ Accrington Stanley (loan)	6	(0)
2018–2019	Newport County	14	(0)
2019	→ Salford City (loan)	0	(0)
2019–2020	AFC Fylde	6	(1)
2020	→ Spennymoor Town (loan)	8	(3)
2020–2021	Spennymoor Town	18	(3)
2021	Colne	7	(1)
- * Club domestic league appearances and goals as of 22:08, 13 September 2021 (UTC)

Tyler Cecil Hornby-Forbes (born 8 March 1996) is an English professional footballer who last played for Colne, as a right-back and right winger.

== Career ==
=== Fleetwood Town ===
Hornby-Forbes was a youth player at Preston North End and progressed through the academy. However, at the end of the season, Hornby-Forbes was released by the club following his end of his scholarships and moved to Fleetwood Town in the summer of 2014.

He made his professional debut for them on 15 November 2014, having lost his mother only a few days beforehand. Usually a winger, Hornby-Forbes played as a right-back in that match due to the absence of usual starter Conor McLaughlin, who was absent on international duty with Northern Ireland. On 20 March 2015, Hornby-Forbes provided an assist for Jamie Proctor to score the club's first goal of the game and the club went on to score a late equaliser to draw 2–2 against Bradford City. Hornby-Forbes went on to be a first team regular in the 2014–15 season, playing in the right-back position and made seventeen appearances. At the end of the 2014–15 season, Hornby-Forbes was offered a new contract by Fleetwood Town.

In the 2015–16 season, Hornby-Forbes scored on his first appearance of the season, in a 4–3 win over Bury on 18 August 2015 and then scored his second goal for the club on 19 September 2015, in a 2–1 loss against Wigan Athletic. However, Hornby-Forbes spent most of the season on the substitute bench, due to Conor McLaughlin's form and his own injury concern. At the end of the season, Hornby-Forbes made sixteen appearances and scoring two times and was offered a new contract by the club. However, Hornby-Forbes' future at the club was in doubt after yet signed a contract and attracted interests from Brighton & Hove Albion when they had a bid from Fleetwood Town accepted.

=== Brighton & Hove Albion ===
On 12 July 2016, Hornby-Forbes transferred to Football League Championship side Brighton & Hove Albion for an undisclosed fee, signing a two-year contract and initially linking up with the club's development squad. He moved on loan to Accrington Stanley in August 2017, in January 2018 he returned to the club. He was released by Brighton at the end of the 2017–18 season.

=== Newport County ===
On 28 June 2018, Hornby-Forbes signed for Newport County on a one-year deal. He made his debut for the club on the opening day of the 2018–19 season, starting in a 3–0 defeat to Mansfield Town. On 27 March 2019 he joined Salford City on loan until the end of the 2018–19 season but did not play a match for them whilst at the club. He was released by Newport at the end of the 2018–19 season.

=== Non-league career ===
In September 2019 he signed for AFC Fylde on non-contract terms. In January 2020, he was loaned out to Spennymoor Town for the rest of the season, before the deal was made permanent in June 2020. In August 2021, he signed for Northern Premier League Division One West side Colne.

== Career statistics ==
As of end of 2021–22 season

Appearances and goals by club, season and competition
Club	Season	League			FA Cup		League Cup		Other		Total	
Club	Season	Division	Apps	Goals	Apps	Goals	Apps	Goals	Apps	Goals	Apps	Goals
Fleetwood Town	2014–15	League One	17	0	0	0	0	0	0	0	17	0
Fleetwood Town	2015–16	League One	16	2	1	0	0	0	4 (Note: Appearance(s) in the EFL Trophy)	0	21	2
Fleetwood Town	Total		33	2	1	0	0	0	4	0	38	2
Brighton & Hove Albion	2016–17	Championship	0	0	0	0	0	0	—		0	0
Brighton & Hove Albion	2017–18	Premier League	0	0	—		—		—		0	0
Brighton & Hove Albion	Total		0	0	0	0	0	0	—		0	0
Accrington Stanley (loan)	2017–18	League Two	6	0	0	0	1	0	3	0	10	0
Newport County	2018–19	League Two	14	0	1	0	2	0	3	0	20	0
AFC Fylde	2019–20	National League	6	1	1	0	—		0	0	7	1
Spennymoor Town (loan)	2019–20	National League North	8	3	—		—		—		8	3
Spennymoor Town	2020–21	National League North	10	0	1	0	—		2 (Note: Appearance(s) in the FA Trophy)	1	13	1
Spennymoor Town	Total		18	3	1	0	—		2	1	21	3
Colne	2021–22	NPL Division One West	7	1	4	0	—		—		11	1
Career total			84	7	8	0	3	0	12	1	107	8
