= Conor McLaughlin =

Northern Irish footballer (born 1991)

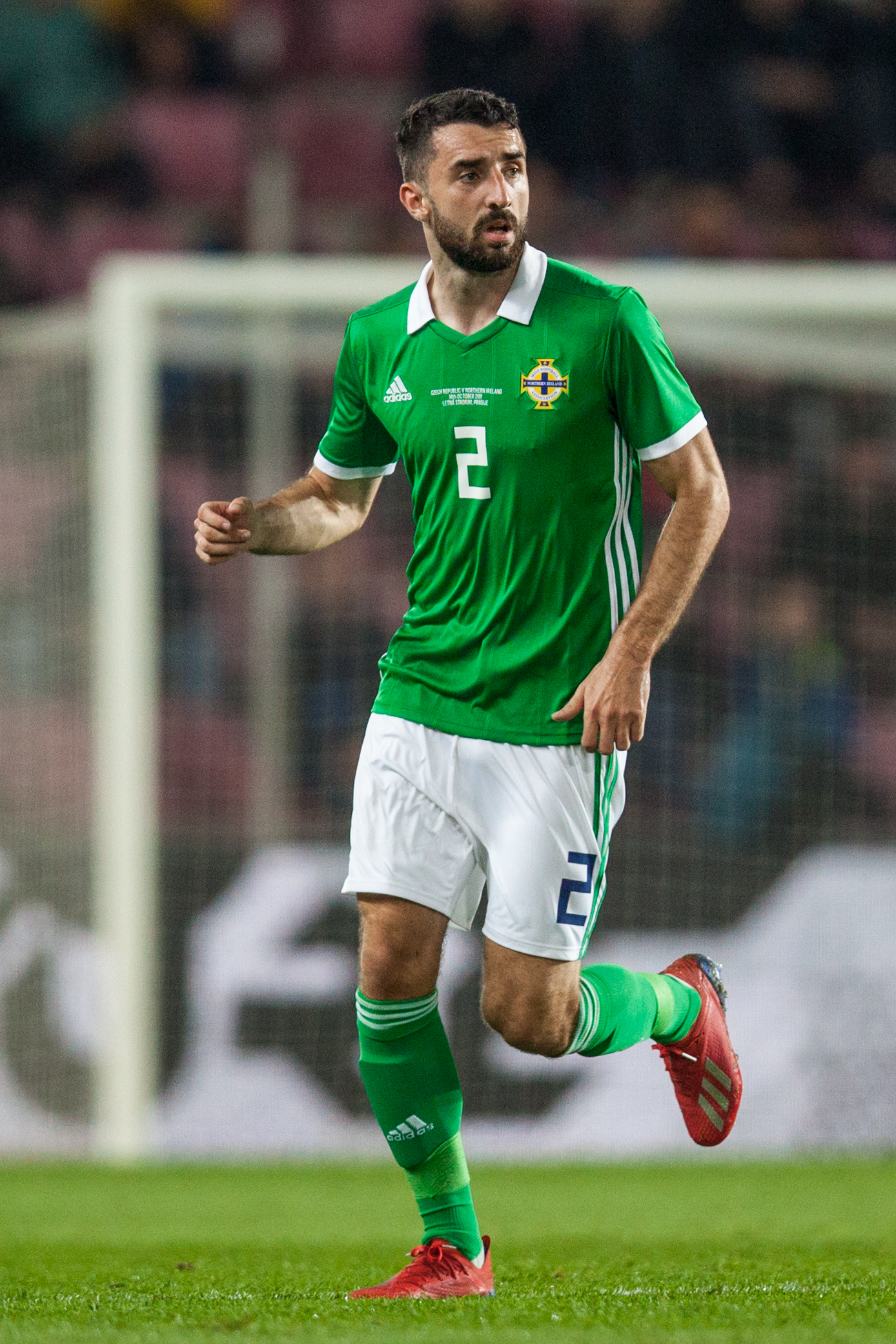
- McLaughlin playing for Northern Ireland in 2019

Personal information
- Full name: Conor Gerard McLaughlin
- Date of birth: 26 July 1991 (age 35)
- Place of birth: Belfast, Northern Ireland
- Height: 1.83 m (6 ft 0 in)
- Position: Right back

Youth career
- Lisburn Youth
- –2007: Linfield
- 2007–2009: Preston North End

Senior career*
Years	Team	Apps	(Gls)
2009–2012	Preston North End	24	(0)
2012	→ Shrewsbury Town (loan)	4	(0)
2012–2017	Fleetwood Town	172	(7)
2017–2019	Millwall	32	(1)
2019–2021	Sunderland	40	(0)
2021–2022	Fleetwood Town	9	(0)
Total		281	(8)

International career
	Northern Ireland U16	9	(0)
	Northern Ireland U17	9	(0)
	Northern Ireland U19	14	(1)
2010–2012	Northern Ireland U21	7	(0)
2011–2021	Northern Ireland	43	(1)
- * Club domestic league appearances and goals

Conor Gerard McLaughlin (born 26 July 1991) is a Northern Irish former footballer who played as a right back.

== Club career ==
=== Preston North End ===
Born in Belfast, he played for Lisburn Youth in Drumbo for the u-12's. McLaughlin turned professional with Preston North End in January 2010. He made his début for Preston on 12 November 2010, in a 0–2 loss against Hull City. In December 2010, McLaughlin signed a contract extension, keeping him with Preston until 2013. He signed a two-month loan deal with Shrewsbury Town in March 2011.

He was transfer-listed by the club in May 2012.

=== Fleetwood Town ===
McLaughlin joined Fleetwood Town on 20 July 2012. He signed a new three-year contract with the club in June 2014. He scored his first goal – for any club – in the Football League in February 2015.

=== Millwall ===
McLaughlin signed for Millwall in July 2017. He scored his first goal for Millwall in a 2–2 draw with Queens Park Rangers on 12 September 2017.

=== Sunderland ===
After leaving Millwall he moved to Sunderland on a free transfer on 1 July 2019. On 25 May 2021 it was announced that he would leave Sunderland at the end of the season, following the expiry of his contract.

=== Return to Fleetwood Town and retirement ===
He re-signed for Fleetwood Town on a short-term deal in October 2021. On 14 January 2022, McLaughlin left Fleetwood for a second time following the expiration of his short-term deal, leaving the club as their all-time third highest EFL appearance maker.

On 14 April 2022, McLaughlin announced his retirement "due to injury".

== International career ==
McLaughlin has represented Northern Ireland at youth international level.

He received his first call-up for the senior national team in October 2011, making his senior début later that month, in a 0–3 defeat against Italy on 11 October 2011.

McLaughlin started Northern Ireland's first game of Euro 2016 against Poland.

== Personal life ==
Conor McLaughlin is the elder brother of Ryan McLaughlin; both have been capped by Northern Ireland.

== Career statistics ==
=== Club ===
As of match played 26 December 2021

Appearances and goals by club, season and competition
Club	Season	League			FA Cup		League Cup		Other		Total	
Club	Season	Division	Apps	Goals	Apps	Goals	Apps	Goals	Apps	Goals	Apps	Goals
Preston North End	2009–10	Championship	0	0	0	0	0	0	—		0	0
Preston North End	2010–11	Championship	7	0	1	0	0	0	—		8	0
Preston North End	2011–12	League One	17	0	2	0	0	0	1 (Note: Appearances in the Football League Trophy)	0	20	0
Preston North End	Total		24	0	3	0	0	0	1	0	28	0
Shrewsbury Town (loan)	2011–12	League Two	4	0	—		—		—		4	0
Fleetwood Town	2012–13	League Two	19	0	1	0	1	0	0	0	21	0
Fleetwood Town	2013–14	League Two	35	0	3	0	0	0	9 (Note: Six appearances in the Football League Trophy and three in the League Two play-offs)	1	47	1
Fleetwood Town	2014–15	League One	39	1	1	0	1	0	0	0	41	1
Fleetwood Town	2015–16	League One	37	2	1	0	1	0	3	0	42	2
Fleetwood Town	2016–17	League One	42	4	4	0	1	0	2 (Note: Appearances in the League One play-offs)	0	49	4
Fleetwood Town	Total		172	7	10	0	4	0	14	1	200	8
Millwall	2017–18	Championship	24	1	2	0	0	0	—		26	1
Millwall	2018–19	Championship	8	0	0	0	3	0	—		11	0
Millwall	Total		32	1	2	0	3	0	0	0	37	1
Sunderland	2019–20	League One	15	0	1	0	4	0	1	0	21	0
Sunderland	2020–21	League One	25	0	1	0	0	0	3	0	29	0
Sunderland	Total		40	0	2	0	4	0	4	0	50	0
Fleetwood Town	2021–22	League One	9	0	1	0	0	0	2	0	12	0
Career total			281	8	18	0	11	0	21	1	331	9

=== International ===
As of 5 October 2021

Appearances and goals by national team and year
National team	Year	Apps	Goals
Northern Ireland	2011	1	0
Northern Ireland	2014	6	0
Northern Ireland	2015	7	0
Northern Ireland	2016	9	1
Northern Ireland	2017	8	0
Northern Ireland	2018	3	0
Northern Ireland	2019	4	0
Northern Ireland	2020	4	0
Northern Ireland	2021	1	0
Total		43	1

As of match played 9 November 2017. Northern Ireland score listed first, score column indicates score after each McLaughlin goal.

International goals by date, venue, cap, opponent, score, result and competition
No.	Date	Venue	Cap	Opponent	Score	Result	Competition
1	11 November 2016	Windsor Park, Belfast, Northern Ireland	22	Azerbaijan	3–0	4–0	2018 FIFA World Cup qualification

== Honours ==
Fleetwood Town

- Football League Two play-offs: 2014

Sunderland

- EFL Trophy: 2020–21

Individual

- EFL Team of the Season: 2016–17
