= Eggert Jónsson =

Icelandic footballer (born 1988)

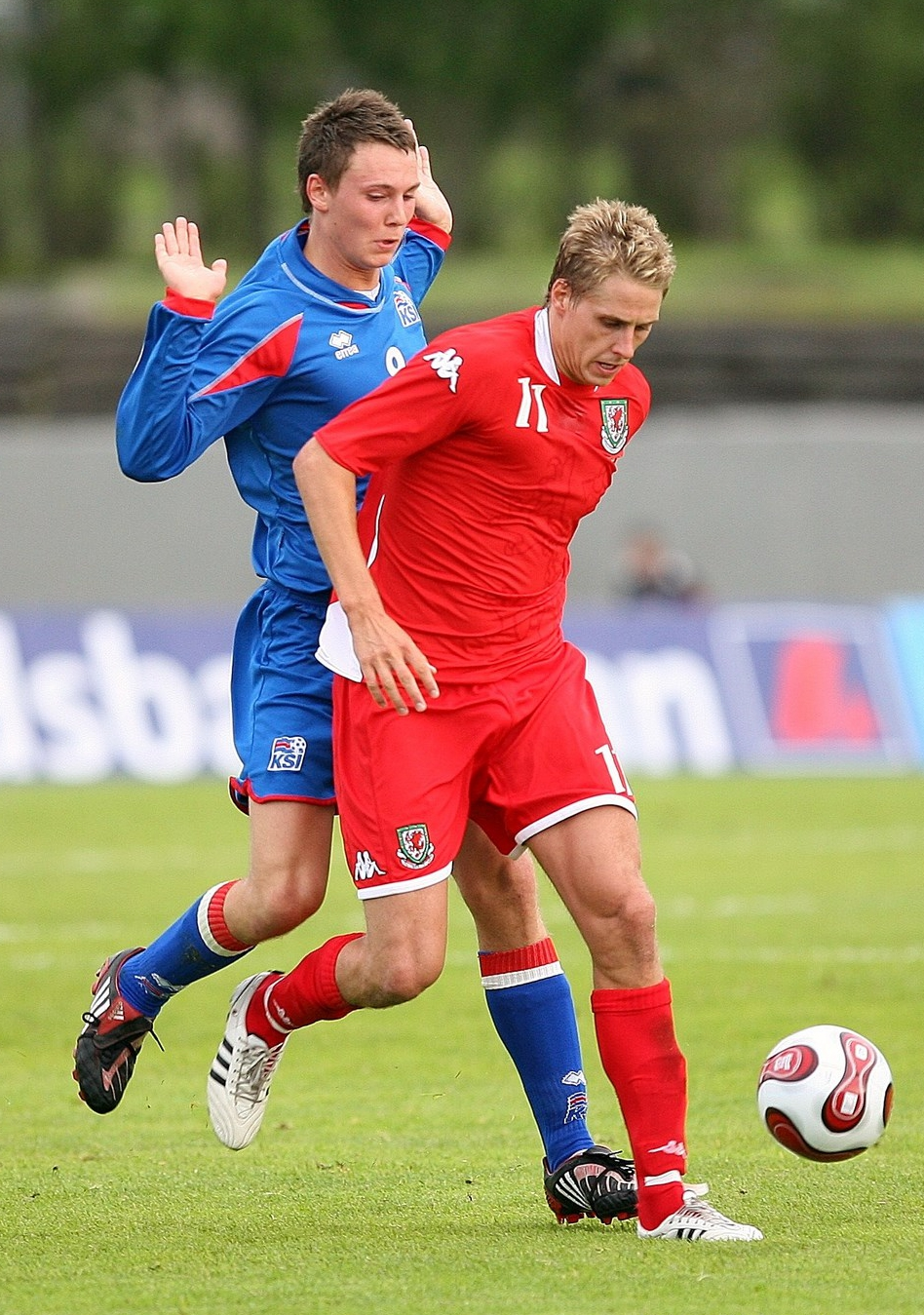
- Jónsson (left) playing for Iceland in 2008

Personal information
- Full name: Eggert Gunnþór Jónsson
- Date of birth: 18 August 1988 (age 38)
- Place of birth: Reykjavík, Iceland
- Height: 1.88 m (6 ft 2 in)
- Positions: Midfielder; defender

Team information
- Current team: Austfjarða

Youth career
- 2005–2007: Heart of Midlothian

Senior career*
Years	Team	Apps	(Gls)
2004–2005	Fjarðabyggð	22	(5)
2006–2012	Heart of Midlothian	134	(8)
2012–2013	Wolverhampton Wanderers	4	(0)
2012	→ Charlton Athletic (loan)	2	(0)
2013–2014	Belenenses	11	(0)
2015	FC Vestsjælland	14	(0)
2015–2017	Fleetwood Town	51	(4)
2017–2020	SønderjyskE	43	(1)
2020–2023	FH	61	(0)
2024–	Austfjarða	44	(4)

International career
2004	Iceland U17	7	(0)
2005–2007	Iceland U19	12	(2)
2007–2011	Iceland U21	15	(0)
2007–2019	Iceland	20	(0)
- * Club domestic league appearances and goals as of 14 October 2026

Eggert Gunnþór Jónsson (born 18 August 1988) is an Icelandic international footballer who plays predominantly as a midfielder but is also capable of playing as a centre back or in both full back roles. He plays for the Icelandic club Austfjarða after joining them from FH.

He joined Scottish Premier League side Hearts as a teenager and eventually established himself in the first-team where he displayed his versatility and even went on to captain the Edinburgh side on numerous occasions before moving to the English Premier League in January 2012 when he signed for Wolves, with whom he made only seven appearances during an eighteen-month stay.

He made his international debut at the age of 19 and is considered to be part of Iceland's golden generation along with the likes of Gylfi Sigurðsson and Kolbeinn Sigþórsson.

== Club career ==
Eggert made his debut as a 15-year-old for Fjarðabyggð in Iceland. After that he trained with Þór Akureyri.

=== Hearts ===
In July 2005, he signed for Hearts, signing a professional contract soon after he turned 18. He made his debut for Hearts on 20 September 2006, appearing as a substitute in a 4–0 League Cup victory over Alloa Athletic. He made his league debut as a substitute in Hearts' 1–0 win over Inverness Caledonian Thistle at Tynecastle on 10 February 2007. His first experience of an Edinburgh Derby came on 1 April 2007 as he appeared as a 66th-minute substitute in 1–0 victory at Easter Road.

Eggert scored his first goal for the club against Heracles Almelo in a 5–1 friendly victory in July 2007. His first competitive goal came against St Mirren in 3–2 at Tynecastle on 19 April 2008. On 28 March 2008, Eggert signed a new four-and-a-half-year contract with the Edinburgh team.

Having played mainly as a centre midfielder and occasionally a centre back for the first few years of his Hearts career Eggert began to display his versatility in the 2008–09 season. New manager Csaba László used Eggert almost exclusively as a right-back for the first few months of the season and during the course of the season he played across the midfield, as a centre back and as a left back. László praised Eggert for his consistent performances despite constantly changing position as well as his diligent attitude. Eggert himself expressed his desire to do his best for the team regardless of which position he played.

Following the departure of Christophe Berra to Wolverhampton Wanderers in January 2009, Eggert was given the number four shirt for the 2009–10 season. Perhaps the most memorable moment of his Hearts career came against Aberdeen as he scored an acrobatic overhead kick to give Hearts a 1–0 victory at Pittodrie on 27 February 2010. Due to the absence of captain Marius Žaliūkas and vice-captain Lee Wallace, Eggert was made captain for the 3–0 defeat to Celtic F.C. at Parkhead on 11 September 2010. He would go on to take the captain's armband for numerous matches while with the Jambos due to the unavailability of Žaliūkas. One such occasion came on 7 May 2011 as he was sent off for a challenge on Nikica Jelavić in a 4–0 away loss against Rangers. During his Hearts career, Eggert made 153 appearances in all competitions and scored nine goals.

=== Wolverhampton Wanderers ===
On 21 December 2011, Eggert agreed to join English Premier League side Wolverhampton Wanderers on a three-and-a-half-year contract for an undisclosed fee, believed to be £250,000 rising to £600,000. The deal was officially completed when the January 2012 transfer window opened.

Jónsson made his debut for Wolves playing the full 90 minutes against Birmingham in the FA Cup on 7 January, but this was one of only made five appearances in total during the remainder of the campaign during which the club suffered relegation.

The player's first team prospects at Molineux failed to improve during Stale Solbakken's tenure as manager, with Jónsson only featuring in one league game as a substitute. To gain playing time he joined fellow Championship club Charlton Athletic on a one-month loan deal in November 2012. On 7 December 2012, he returned from his loan spell having made two appearances for the Addicks.

He did not make any further appearances during the remainder of the 2012–13 season and on 12 July 2013, Wolves announced that an agreement had been reached to terminate his contract with two years remaining.

=== Belenenses ===
Within days of his release from Wolves, Jónsson joined Portuguese club Belenenses. Late in the summer of 2014 Eggert mutually terminated his contract with the Portuguese side, returning to Iceland to recover from injury.

=== Fleetwood Town ===
In 2015, Fleetwood Town signed Jónsson on a one-year contract following expiration of his deal with FC Vestsjælland. After making 63 appearances in all competitions for Fleetwood, in January 2017 he signed for Danish side SønderjyskE.

=== SønderjyskE ===
After joining SønderjyskE in 2017, Jónsson played 43 times for the club. During the 2020 COVID-19 hiatus, his contract was extended until July 2020. Jónsson scored in the Super League game that relegated Silkeborg.

=== Fimleikafélag Hafnarfjarðar ===
In August 2020, Jonsson signed for Icelandic club Fimleikafélag Hafnarfjarðar.

== International career ==
Jónsson received his first call-up to the Iceland national team in November 2007 for the Euro 2008 qualifier against Denmark on 21 November. He made his debut as a 73-minute replacement for Emil Hallfreðsson in the 3–0 Group F defeat at the Parken Stadium.

He was part of the Iceland under-21 team at the 2011 UEFA European Under-21 Football Championship, a squad which was considered to be the golden generation of Icelandic football. Iceland were eliminated from Group A by a three-way tie-breaker as they finished with an identical record to both Belarus and Denmark, allowing Belarus to advance along with group winners Switzerland.

== =Club÷ ==
As of match played 19 December 2014.

Club	Season	League	League		Cup		League Cup		Europe		Total	
Club	Season	League	Apps	Goals	Apps	Goals	Apps	Goals	Apps	Goals	Apps	Goals
Fjarðabyggð	2004	3. deild	15	5	3	1	0	0	0	0	18	6
Fjarðabyggð	2005	2. deild	7	0	1	0	0	0	0	0	8	0
Fjarðabyggð	Club total		22	5	4	1	0	0	0	0	26	6
Hearts	2006–07	Scottish Premier League	3	0	1	0	1	0	0	0	5	0
Hearts	2007–08	Scottish Premier League	28	1	1	0	3	0	0	0	32	1
Hearts	2008–09	Scottish Premier League	30	3	2	0	1	0	0	0	33	3
Hearts	2009–10	Scottish Premier League	28	3	1	0	2	0	0	0	31	3
Hearts	2010–11	Scottish Premier League	29	0	1	0	2	1	0	0	32	1
Hearts	2011–12	Scottish Premier League	16	1	0	0	1	0	3	0	20	1
Hearts	Club total		134	8	6	0	10	1	3	0	153	9
Wolves	2011–12	Premier League	3	0	2	0	0	0	0	0	5	0
Wolves	2012–13	Football League Championship	1	0	0	0	1	0	0	0	2	0
Wolves	Club total		4	0	2	0	1	0	0	0	7	0
Charlton Athletic (loan)	2012–13	Football League Championship	2	0	0	0	0	0	0	0	2	0
Charlton Athletic (loan)	Club total		2	0	0	0	0	0	0	0	2	0
Belenenses	2013–14	Primeira Liga	11	0	0	0	0	0	0	0	11	0
Belenenses	Club total		11	0	0	0	0	0	0	0	11	0
Career Total			173	13	12	1	11	1	3	0	199	15

=== International ===
Appearances and goals by national team and year
National team	Year	Apps	Goals
Iceland	2007	1	0
Iceland	2008	1	0
Iceland	2009	2	0
Iceland	2010	4	0
Iceland	2011	4	0
Iceland	2012	6	0
Iceland	2013	–	
Iceland	2014	–	
Iceland	2015	–	
Iceland	2016	–	
Iceland	2017	–	
Iceland	2018	1	0
Iceland	2019	1	0
Total		20	0

== Honours ==
SønderjyskE

- Danish Cup: 2019–20
