= Matty Hughes =

English footballer

Personal information
- Full name: Matthew Hughes
- Date of birth: 17 July 1992 (age 34)
- Place of birth: Billinge, England
- Position: Forward

Youth career
- Everton

Senior career*
Years	Team	Apps	(Gls)
2012	Golborne Sports		
2012–2014	Skelmersdale United	58	(25)
2014–2015	Fleetwood Town	11	(0)
2014	→ Chester (loan)	8	(4)
2015	→ Chester (loan)	17	(0)
2015–2017	AFC Fylde	73	(9)
2017–2018	Chorley	29	(1)
2018–2021	Chester	41	(7)
2020–2021	→ Lancaster City (dual registration)	0	(0)
2021	Stalybridge Celtic	0	(0)
2021–2022	Warrington Rylands	19	(1)
2022–2024	Golborne Sports	10	(5)
- * Club domestic league appearances and goals as of 17:20, 14 August 2024 (UTC)

Matthew Hughes (born 17 July 1992) is an English footballer. He played in the English Football League for Fleetwood Town.

== Career ==
Hughes began his career playing at the Everton academy until he was released in 2012. He played amateur football with Golborne Sports becoming top goal scorer in half a season before joining Skelmersdale United in November 2012. He impressed for the Northern Premier League side and became a prolific goalscorer which earned him a move to Fleetwood Town in January 2014. He made his Football League debut on 22 February 2014 in a 1–0 defeat away at Mansfield Town. He spent two loan spells with Chester during the 2014–15 season, making 26 appearances. At the end of the season, Fleetwood Town announced that they would not be renewing Hughes' contract.

On 30 May 2015, AFC Fylde announced they had signed Hughes on a two-year contract.

In August 2017 he moved to Chorley.

In May 2018 he rejoined Chester.

In December 2020 he joined on dual registration terms after a series of bad injuries.

In June 2021 he joined Stalybridge Celtic and was an unused substitute for two Northern Premier League matches before leaving the club at the end September.
