= Thomas Chamberlayne =

Thomas Chamberlayne may refer to:

- Sir Thomas Chamberlayne (judge) (died 1625), English judge who served as Chief Justice of Chester
- Sir Thomas Chamberlayne, 1st Baronet (died 1643), of Wickham, Oxfordshire supported the Royalist cause in the English Civil War. He was Sheriff of Oxfordshire in 1643
- Sir Thomas Chamberlayne, 2nd Baronet (c. 1635–1682), one of few men to receive a renewal of the baronetcy from the Lord Protector Oliver Cromwell
- Thomas Chamberlayne (cricketer) (1805–1876), English cricketer and yachtsman
- Thomas Chamberlayne (priest), Dean of Bristol, 1739–1757

== See also ==
- Thomas Chamberlain (disambiguation)
- Chamberlayne (disambiguation)
