= Thomas Chamberlain =

Thomas Chamberlain may refer to:

- Sir Thomas Chamberlain, 1st Baronet (died 1643), who supported the Royalist cause in the English Civil War
- Sir Thomas Chamberlain, 2nd Baronet (c. 1635–1682), who received a renewal of the baronetcy from the Lord Protector Oliver Cromwell
- Thomas Chamberlain (soldier) (1841–1896), lieutenant colonel in the U.S. army during the American Civil War
- Thomas Chrowder Chamberlin (1843–1928), U.S. geologist
- Thomas Chamberlain (MP for Appleby) (fl. 1397), MP for Appleby
- Thomas Chamberlain, a character in The Killer Angels

== See also ==
- Tom Chamberlain (disambiguation)
- Thomas Chamberlayne (disambiguation)
- Chamberlain (surname)
