= Ryan Brobbel =

English-Northern Irish footballer (born 1993)

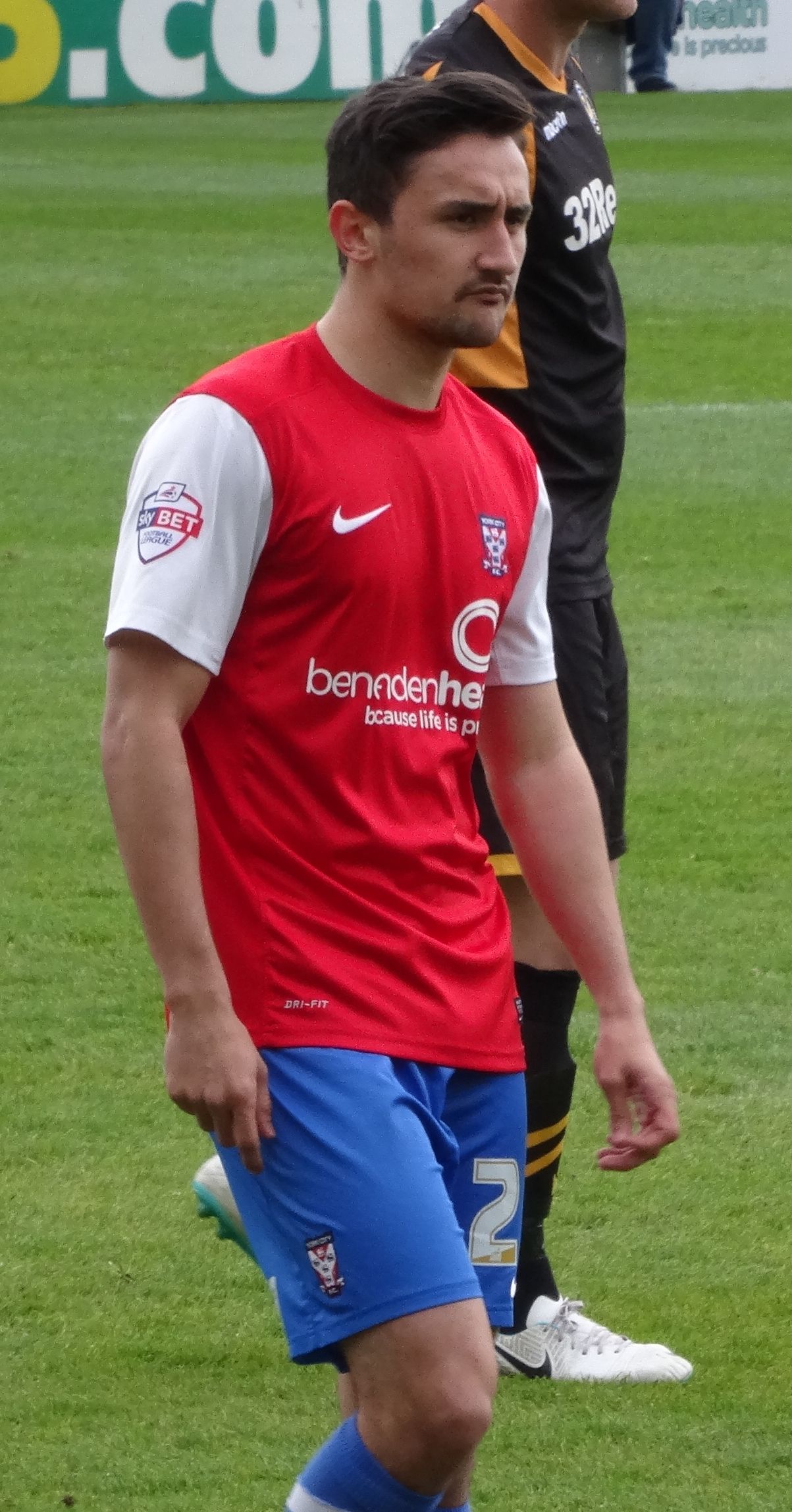
- Brobbel playing for York City in 2014

Personal information
- Full name: Ryan Brobbel
- Date of birth: 5 March 1993 (age 33)
- Place of birth: Hartlepool, England
- Height: 5 ft 8 in (1.73 m)
- Position: Winger

Team information
- Current team: The New Saints
- Number: 8

Youth career
- 2000–2013: Middlesbrough

Senior career*
Years	Team	Apps	(Gls)
2013–2015	Middlesbrough	0	(0)
2013–2014	→ York City (loan)	12	(3)
2014	→ York City (loan)	7	(1)
2014	→ Hartlepool United (loan)	15	(0)
2015	Darlington 1883	2	(0)
2015–2016	Whitby Town	16	(3)
2016–	The New Saints	264	(109)

International career
	Northern Ireland U17	9	(1)
	Northern Ireland U18	2	(0)
	Northern Ireland U19	11	(1)
2013–2014	Northern Ireland U21	9	(1)
- * Club domestic league appearances and goals as of 21:31, 5 September 2026 (UTC)

Ryan Brobbel (born 5 March 1993) is a professional footballer who plays as a winger for Cymru Premier club The New Saints.

Brobbel signed a professional contract with Middlesbrough in 2011 after progressing through their youth system. He had two loan spells with York City in the 2013–14 season and played for them in the League Two play-offs. He had a loan spell with Hartlepool United in late 2014 and was released by Middlesbrough in May 2015.

== Early life ==
Brobbel was born in Hartlepool, County Durham and attended High Tunstall College of Science.

== Club career ==
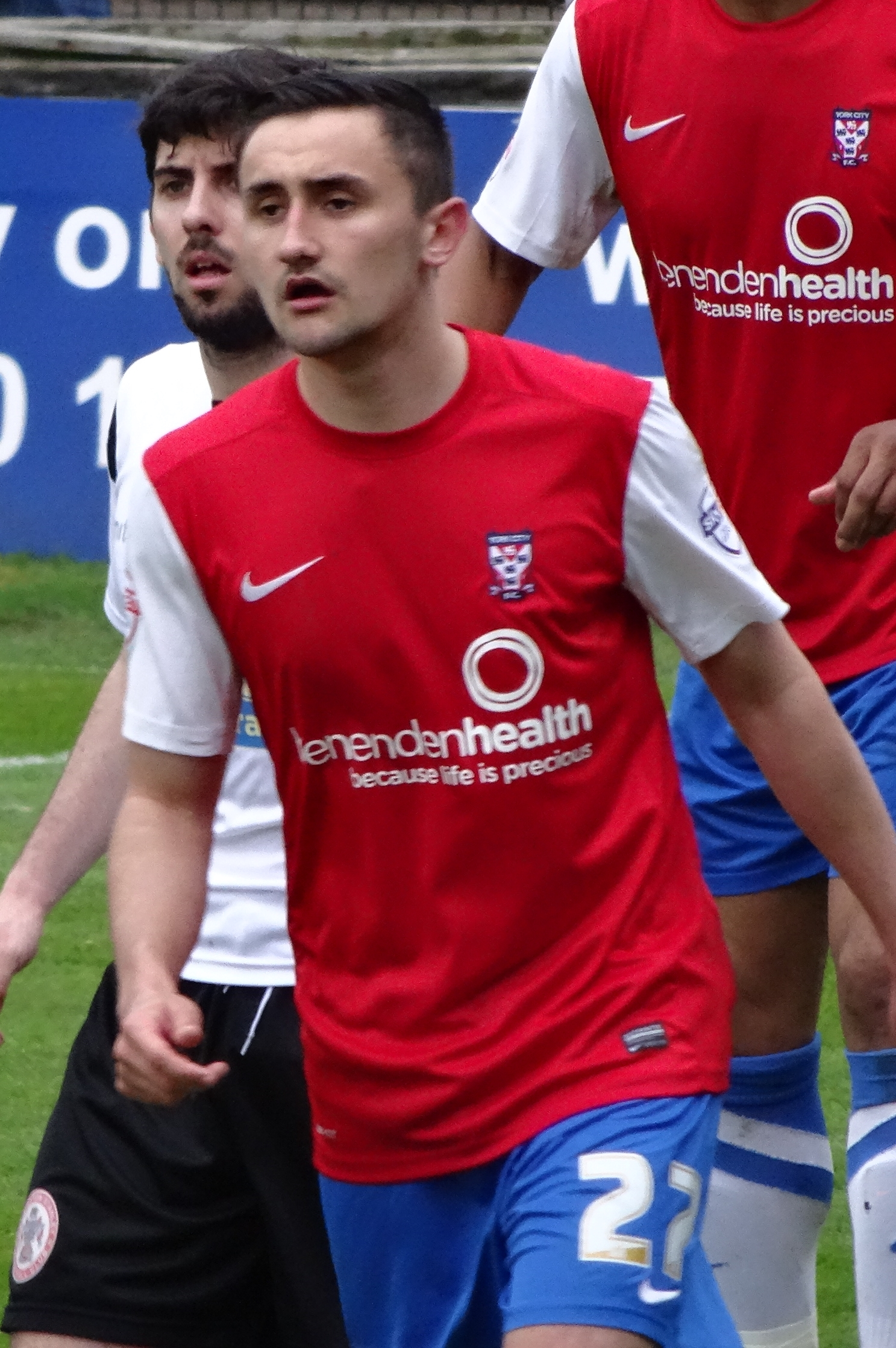
Brobbel playing for York City in 2014

Brobbel started his career with the youth system of Middlesbrough and signed a three-year professional contract with the club on 1 May 2011 after finishing his apprenticeship. He joined League Two club York City on 30 August 2013 on a one-month loan, making his debut the following day as a 74th-minute substitute for Ashley Chambers in a 2–1 defeat away to Exeter City. Brobbel scored his first career goal in the second minute of the following match at home to Mansfield Town on 14 September 2013 with a header from six yards, although York went on to lose 2–1. On 27 September 2013, after making three appearances and scoring one goal for York, Brobbel's loan was extended to 5 January 2014. York opted against extending his loan when it expired, having made 13 appearances and scored three goals for the club. Brobbel rejoined York on 27 March 2014 on loan until the end of the 2013–14 season, following an injury to Josh Carson, and made his second debut for the club two days later in a 0–0 home with Burton Albion. He played in York's 1–0 home defeat to Fleetwood Town in the play-off semi-final first leg, but did not play in the second leg, after which York were eliminated 1–0 on aggregate. He made eight appearances and scored one goal in his second spell with York.

Brobbel signed a new one-year contract with Middlesbrough in July 2014, before joining League Two club Hartlepool United, his hometown club, on a one-month loan on 8 August. He made his debut as a seventy-sixth-minute substitute in a 1–0 away defeat to Stevenage on 9 August 2014, and having impressed the loan was extended for a second month in September. Another one-month extension came in October 2014, before being sent back to Middlesbrough by new Hartlepool manager Paul Murray in early November having made 17 appearances for the club. Brobbel struggled to get into Middlesbrough's under-21 team after returning, with manager Paul Jenkins saying that Brobbel was "at a crossroads in his career". He had trials with League One clubs Doncaster Rovers and Scunthorpe United, scoring two goals for Scunthorpe in a reserve-team match in April 2015. He was a member of the Middlesbrough under-21 team that won the Under-21 Premier League Division 2 and North Riding Senior Cup, but was released in May 2015 after a 15-year association with the club.

Brobbel trained with Northern Premier League Premier Division club Darlington 1883 in the summer of 2015, before going on trial with Torquay United of the National League. He signed for Darlington 1883, and made his debut in a 2–1 home win over Ramsbottom United on 9 September 2015. He went on trial with a club in Scotland, before he left Darlington in early-October 2015 making only two appearances for the club. Brobbel joined Darlington's Northern Premier League Premier Division rivals Whitby Town, and debuted a 78th-minute substitute in a 0–0 away draw with Halesowen Town on 3 October 2015.

On 1 February 2016, Brobbel signed for Welsh Premier League champions The New Saints. Brobbel was named in the Welsh Premier League team of the year in the 2016–17 season. After scoring 15 goals in 30 league games, he made the Welsh Premier League team of the year again in the 2022–23 season and signed a new two-year contract at the end of the campaign.

== International career ==
Brobbel is eligible to represent England, the Republic of Ireland and Northern Ireland at international level, and has been on training camps with both Irish teams. He played for the Northern Ireland national under-17, under-18 and under-19 teams before making his debut for the under-21 team in a 3–0 away defeat against Malta on 30 May 2013. His first goal for the under-21s came in a 2–1 home defeat to Serbia in a 2015 UEFA European Under-21 Championship qualification match on 9 September 2014. He earned nine caps and scored one goal for the under-21s from 2013 to 2014.

== Career statistics ==
As of 18 April 2026

Appearances and goals by club, season and competition
Club	Season	League			National Cup (Note: Appearances in FA Cup and Welsh Cup)		League Cup (Note: Appearances in League Cup and Welsh League Cup)		Europe		Other		Total	
Club	Season	Division	Apps	Goals	Apps	Goals	Apps	Goals	Apps	Goals	Apps	Goals	Apps	Goals
Middlesbrough	2013–14	Championship	0	0	—		0	0	—		—		0	0
Middlesbrough	2014–15	Championship	0	0	0	0	—		—		0	0	0	0
Middlesbrough	Total		0	0	0	0	0	0	—		0	0	0	0
York City (loan)	2013–14	League Two	19	4	1	0	—		—		1 (Note: Appearance in League Two play-offs)	0	21	4
Hartlepool United (loan)	2014–15	League Two	15	0	—		1	0	—		1 (Note: Appearance in Football League Trophy)	0	17	0
Darlington 1883	2015–16	NPL Premier Division	2	0	0	0	—		—		0	0	2	0
Whitby Town	2015–16	NPL Premier Division	16	3	0	0	—		—		3	1	19	4
The New Saints	2015–16	Welsh Premier League	8	1	3	1	—		—		—		11	2
The New Saints	2016–17	Welsh Premier League	31	7	3	0	2	0	4 (Note: Appearances in UEFA Champions League)	0	3 (Note: Appearances in Scottish Challenge Cup)	1	43	8
The New Saints	2017–18	Welsh Premier League	29	8	1	0	4	2	4	0	4	0	42	10
The New Saints	2018–19	Welsh Premier League	23	15	4	2	3	0	1 (Note: Appearances in UEFA Europa League)	0	1	0	32	17
The New Saints	2019–20	Welsh Premier League	24	8	2	1	0	0	6 (Note: Four appearances in UEFA Champions League, two appearances in UEFA Europa League)	0	1	0	33	9
The New Saints	2020–21	Cymru Premier	14	12	0	0	0	0	2	0	0	0	16	12
The New Saints	2021–22	Cymru Premier	27	12	3	0	0	0	0	0	0	0	30	12
The New Saints	2022–23	Cymru Premier	30	15	4	7	0	0	4	1	3	0	41	23
The New Saints	2023–24	Cymru Premier	18	13	3	1	1	1	4	0	5	1	31	16
The New Saints	2024–25	Cymru Premier	24	4	2	1	1	0	11 (Note: Four appearances in UEFA Champions League, one appearance in Europa League six appearances in UEFA Europa Conference League)	0	0	0	38	5
The New Saints	2025–26	Cymru Premier	31	14	0	0	1	0	4 (Note: Two appearances in UEFA Champions League, two appearances in UEFA Europa Conference League)	0	0	0	36	14
The New Saints	Total		259	109	25	13	12	3	40	1	17	2	353	128
Career total			311	116	26	13	13	3	40	1	22	3	412	136

== Honours ==
The New Saints

- Welsh Premier League/ Cymru Premier: 2015–16, 2016–17, 2017–18, 2018–19, 2021–22, 2022–23, 2023–24, 2024–25
- Welsh Cup: 2015–16, 2018–19,2021–22, 2022–23, 2024–25
- Welsh League Cup: 2016–17, 2017–18, 2023–24, 2024–25

Individual

- Welsh Premier League Team of the Year: 2016–17, 2022–23
