= Tom Chamberlain =

Tom Chamberlain may refer to:

- Tom Chamberlain (footballer, born 1996), English footballer for Selby Town
- Tom Chamberlain (footballer, born 2002), English footballer for Cheltenham Town
- Tom Chamberlain (rugby union) (born 1987), New Zealand rugby union player

== See also ==
- Thomas Chamberlain (disambiguation)
