= Oyebanjo =

Oyebanjo is the name of several people:

- D'banj (born 1980), Nigerian musician
- Lanre Oyebanjo (born 1990), footballer
