= Tom Allan (footballer) =

English footballer (born 1994)

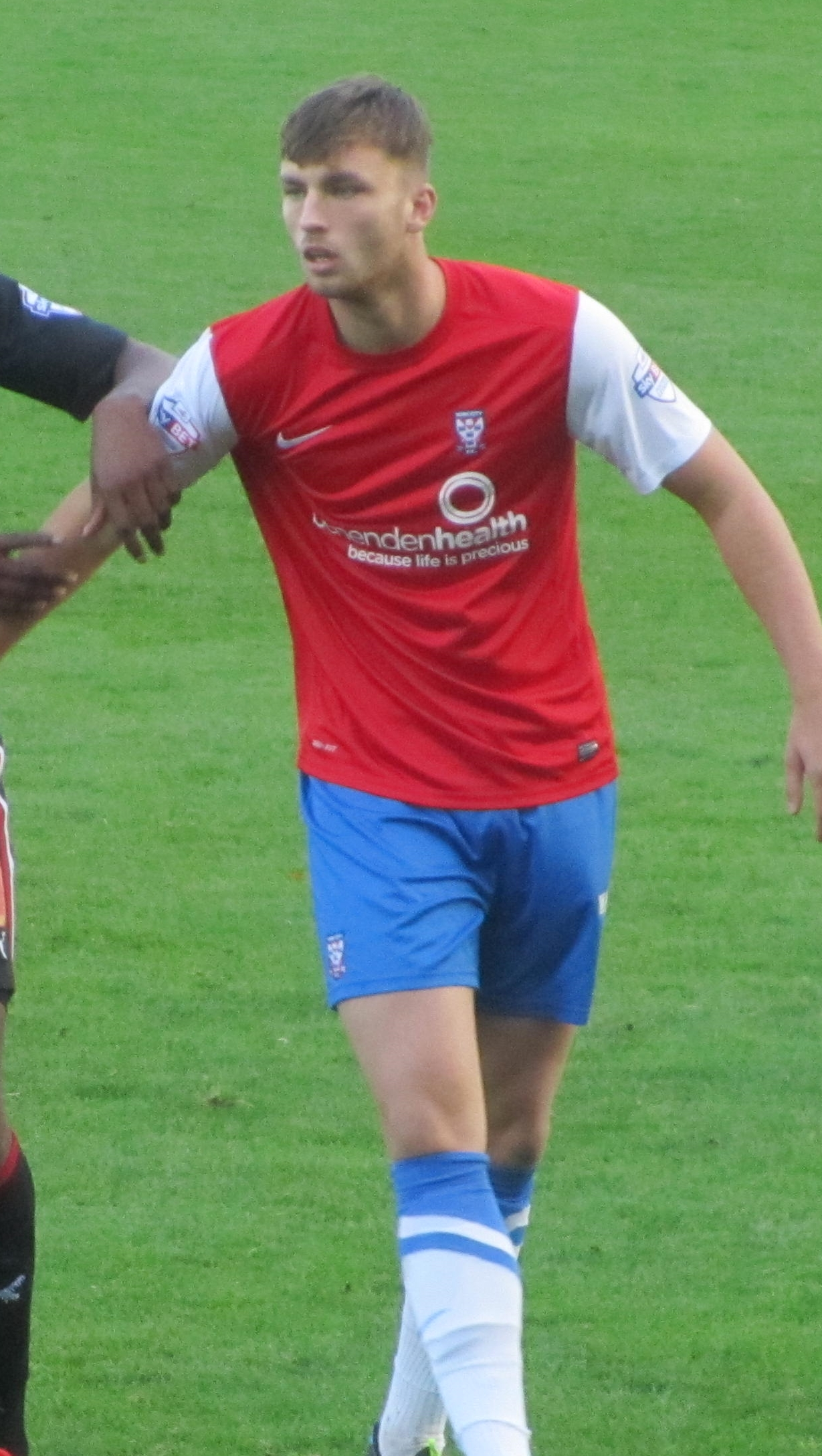
- Allan playing for York City in 2013

Personal information
- Full name: Thomas James Allan
- Date of birth: 30 October 1994 (age 32)
- Place of birth: York, England
- Height: 6 ft 4 in (1.92 m)
- Positions: Centre back; left back

Team information
- Current team: Bridlington Town

Youth career
- 2002–2011: York City

Senior career*
Years	Team	Apps	(Gls)
2011–2014	York City	10	(0)
2011	→ Hucknall Town (loan)	1	(0)
2013	→ Harrogate Town (loan)	2	(0)
2014–2015	Gateshead	20	(1)
2015–2018	Alfreton Town	103	(13)
2016–2017	→ Tadcaster Albion (loan)	5	(3)
2018–2020	York City	5	(0)
2018–2019	→ Alfreton Town (loan)	19	(2)
2019	→ Farsley Celtic (loan)	7	(2)
2019–2020	→ Farsley Celtic (loan)	11	(1)
2020	→ Scarborough Athletic (loan)		
2020–2021	Farsley Celtic	14	(2)
2021	Alfreton Town	6	(3)
2021–2024	Farsley Celtic	101	(8)
2024–	Bridlington Town	?	(?)
- * Club domestic league appearances and goals as of 17:10, 24 April 2026 (UTC)

Thomas James Allan (born 30 October 1994) is an English professional footballer who plays as a centre back or left back for Bridlington Town A.F.C. He has played in the Football League for York City.

Allan started his career with hometown club York City aged eight and had a loan spell with Hucknall Town of the Northern Premier League Division One South in 2011. He signed a professional contract with York in December 2012, and made his first-team debut in League Two shortly after. He had a loan spell with Conference North club Harrogate Town in 2013 before being released by York in 2014. He spent one season with Conference Premier club Gateshead before being released.

== Career ==
=== York City ===
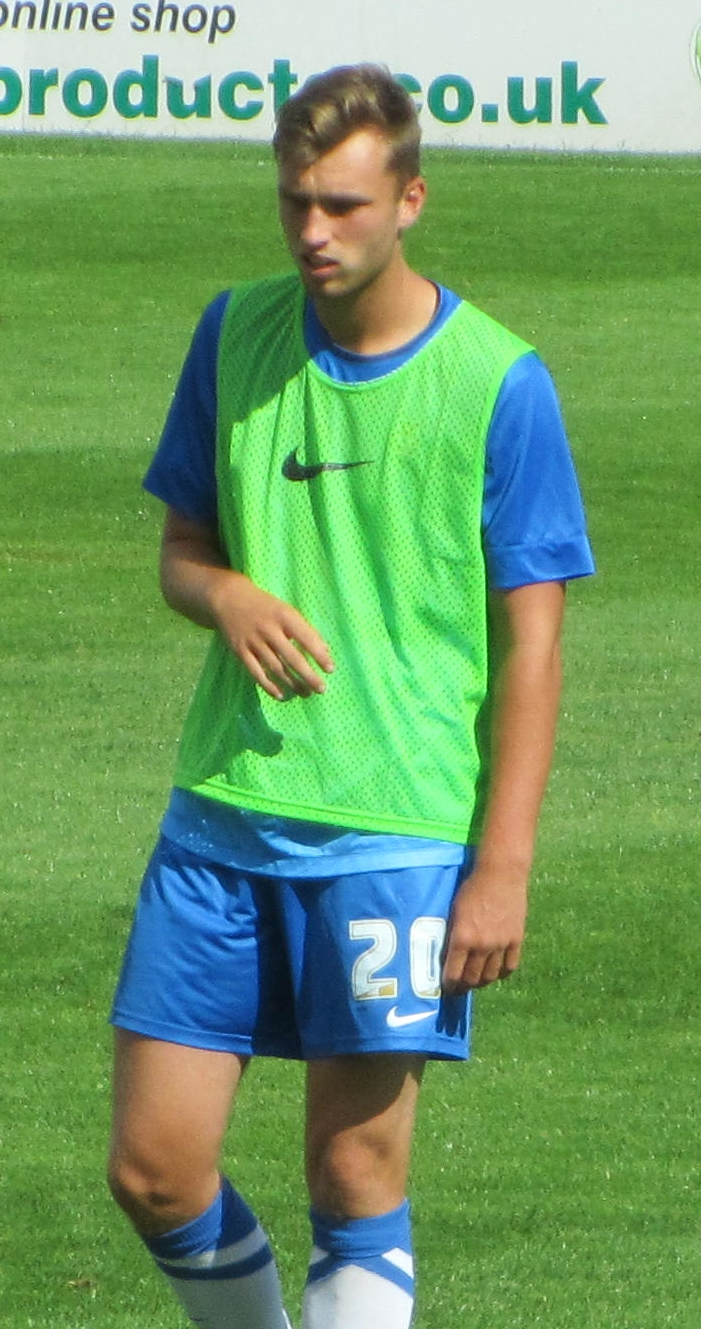
Allan training with York City in 2013

Born in York, Allan joined the youth system of hometown club York City in 2002 at the age of eight. He signed for Northern Premier League Division One South club Hucknall Town on loan in October 2011, making his only appearance as a substitute against Stamford before returning to York in November. While still a second-year trainee, he signed a one-and-a-half-year professional contract with York on 6 December 2012, with manager Gary Mills commenting: "Tom has come on unbelievably in the last 12 months and thoroughly deserves his first professional contract". He made his first-team debut as a 56th-minute substitute for Chris Doig in York's 4–1 home win over Bristol Rovers on 15 December 2012. Allan made his full debut on 13 April 2013 in a 2–0 away win over Northampton Town, and finished the 2012–13 season with five appearances for York.

He joined Conference North club Harrogate Town on a one-month loan on 21 November 2013, having made four appearances for York up to that point in 2013–14. His debut came two days later in a 3–0 victory away to Workington, and made one more appearance for the club before returning to York on 20 December 2013. Allan came on as an 89th-minute substitute for Will Hayhurst in York's 0–0 away draw with Fleetwood Town in the play-off semi-final second leg, resulting in the team being eliminated 1–0 on aggregate. This was his sixth appearance for York in 2013–14. He was released by York in May 2014, as the offer of a new two-year contract was withdrawn after he failed to respond to it within a one-month timeframe.

=== Non-League ===
Allan joined Conference Premier club Gateshead, managed by his former York manager Mills, on 30 June 2014. He signed a one-year contract that would be extended by a further year pending on him making a pre-determined number of appearances. He made his debut on 23 August 2014 as a second-half substitute for Lewis Guy in a 6–1 home defeat to Grimsby Town. He scored his first career goal on 25 October 2014 in a 4–0 home win against Gainsborough Trinity in the FA Cup. Allan made 22 appearances and scored 2 goals for a Gateshead team that ranked 10th in the Conference Premier in 2014–15. He was released by new manager Malcolm Crosby in June 2015.

Allan signed for newly relegated National League North club Alfreton Town on 6 July 2015 on a one-year contract. Allan dropped down two divisions in December 2016 by joining Northern Premier League Division One North club Tadcaster Albion on loan. He scored on his debut on 17 December 2016 in a 3–2 away win over Radcliffe Borough, dispossessing Lassana Nalatche before shooting into the bottom corner. In June 2017, Allan signed a new one-year contract at Alfreton.

=== Return to York City ===
Allan re-signed for York City, with the club now in the National League North, on 17 May 2018. He rejoined Alfreton Town on 16 November 2018 on loan until 1 January 2019, having started only four matches for York in 2018–19. His debut came the following day when starting Alfreton's 3–1 home win over Nuneaton Borough in the league. The loan was extended until the end of the season in January 2019.

Allan missed the start of the 2019–20 season with a three-match suspension before joining York's divisional rivals Farsley Celtic on 16 August 2019 on a one-month loan. He made seven appearances for Farsley, scoring two goals, and after returning to York went straight into the starting line-up for their 2–0 away win over Irlam in the FA Cup as cover for the injured Steve McNulty. He returned to Farsley Celtic on 17 October on loan until 4 January 2020, making 13 appearances and scoring 1 goal during his second loan spell. Allan joined Northern Premier League Premier Division club Scarborough Athletic on 20 February on a one-month loan.

Allan was released by York at the end of the 2019–20 season, in which he made two appearances for the club in all competitions. York had finished in second place in the 2019–20 National League North on points per game after the season was suspended in March 2020 because of the COVID-19 pandemic in the United Kingdom before being eliminated from the play-offs in the semi-final.

=== Post York City career ===
Allan signed for Farsley Celtic on 1 August 2020 on a one-year contract.

Prior to the 2021–22 season, Allan returned to former club Alfreton Town.

After a short spell with Alfreton, Allan returned to Farsley Celtic in October 2021.

In November 2024, Allan joined Bridlington Town A.F.C and was retained for the 2025–26 season.

== Style of play ==
Allan primarily plays at centre back and left back. By late 2016, he had started playing as a left winger.

== Career statistics ==
As of match played 18 September 2021

Appearances and goals by club, season and competition
Club	Season	League			FA Cup		League Cup		Other		Total	
Club	Season	Division	Apps	Goals	Apps	Goals	Apps	Goals	Apps	Goals	Apps	Goals
York City	2011–12	Conference Premier	0	0	—		—		0	0	0	0
York City	2012–13	League Two	5	0	0	0	0	0	0	0	5	0
York City	2013–14	League Two	5	0	0	0	0	0	1 (Note: Appearance in League Two play-offs)	0	6	0
York City	Total		10	0	0	0	0	0	1	0	11	0
Hucknall Town (loan)	2011–12	Northern Premier League; Division One South	1	0	—		—		—		1	0
Harrogate Town (loan)	2013–14	Conference North	2	0	—		—		—		2	0
Gateshead	2014–15	Conference Premier	20	1	2	1	—		0	0	22	2
Alfreton Town	2015–16	National League North	36	2	3	0	—		1 (Note: Appearance(s) in FA Trophy)	0	40	2
Alfreton Town	2016–17	National League North	30	4	6	1	—		0	0	36	5
Alfreton Town	2017–18	National League North	37	7	2	1	—		1	0	40	8
Alfreton Town	Total		103	13	11	2	—		2	0	116	15
Tadcaster Albion (loan)	2016–17	Northern Premier League; Division One North	5	3	—		—		2 (Note: One appearance in West Riding County Cup, one in Northern Premier League Challenge Cup)	0	7	3
York City	2018–19	National League North	5	0	1	0	—		—		6	0
York City	2019–20	National League North	0	0	2	0	—		0	0	2	0
York City	Total		5	0	3	0	—		0	0	8	0
Alfreton Town (loan)	2018–19	National League North	19	2	—		—		1	0	20	2
Farsley Celtic (loan)	2019–20	National League North	18	3	—		—		2	0	20	3
Farsley Celtic	2020–21	National League North	14	2	2	0	—		2	1	18	3
Farsley Celtic	Total		32	5	2	0	0	0	4	1	38	6
Alfreton Town	2021–22	National League North	6	3	1	0	—		0	0	7	3
Career total			203	27	19	3	0	0	10	1	232	31
