= Mike Atkinson =

English–Belizean footballer (born 1994)

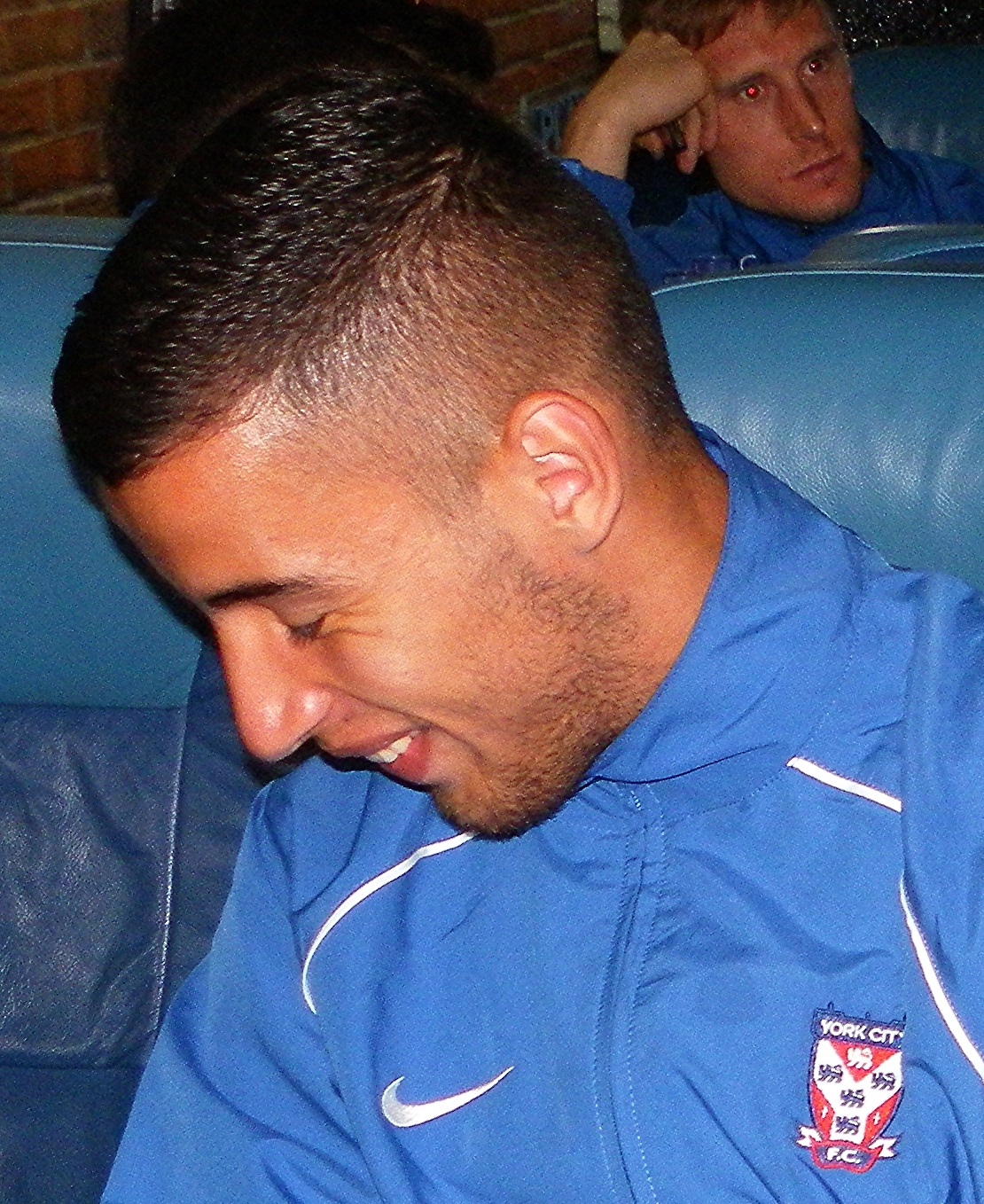
- Atkinson with York City in 2013

Personal information
- Full name: Michael Thomas Atkinson
- Date of birth: 2 December 1994 (age 31)
- Place of birth: York, England
- Height: 5 ft 10 in (1.78 m)
- Positions: Right-back; midfielder

Team information
- Current team: North Leigh

Youth career
- –2013: York City

Senior career*
Years	Team	Apps	(Gls)
2013	York City	0	(0)
2013	→ Farsley (loan)	2	(0)
2013	→ Northallerton Town (loan)	1	(0)
2013	→ Scarborough Athletic (loan)		
2013–2014	Scarborough Athletic		
2014	Selby Town		
2018	Oxford City	2	(0)
2019–	North Leigh	6	(0)

International career^{‡}
2017–	Belize	6	(0)
- * Club domestic league appearances and goals as of 19:04, 10 June 2021 (UTC) ‡ National team caps and goals as of 19:04, 10 June 2021 (UTC)

Michael Thomas Atkinson (born 2 December 1994) is a footballer who plays as a right-back or midfielder for Combined Counties League Premier Division North club North Leigh and the Belize national team.

== Early life ==
Atkinson was born in York and attended Archbishop Holgate's School.

== Club career ==
=== York City ===
He played for York Schoolboys before joining York City's youth system. In March 2013, he joined Northern Premier League Division One North club Farsley on loan, making his debut on 30 March when starting a 2–1 away win over Ramsbottom United. He finished the loan with two appearances.

Atkinson signed a one-year professional contract with York in June 2013. His first and only involvement with the first team came as an unused substitute in a 0–0 home draw with Hartlepool United on 17 August. He joined Northern League Division Two club Northallerton Town in September 2013 on a one-month loan. He made only one appearance, starting in a 4–2 home defeat to Chester-le-Street Town on 28 September, and York manager Nigel Worthington wanted to loan him to a club in a higher division.

=== Non-League ===
Atkinson joined Northern Premier League Division One South club Scarborough Athletic on 8 November 2013 on a short-term loan, signing permanently on 19 December after being released by York. He signed for Northern Counties East League Division One club Selby Town in January 2014.

Atkinson signed for National League South club Oxford City in July 2018 after a successful trial. He made his debut as an 84th-minute substitute in a 1–1 draw away to Weston-super-Mare on 25 August. He finished his time at the club with two appearances.

Atkinson signed for Southern League Division One Central club North Leigh in December 2019, making his debut on 26 December when starting in a 3–0 home win over Didcot Town. He finished the season, which ended prematurely due to the COVID-19 pandemic, with four appearances, and signed a new contract with the club in July 2020. He made three appearances in a second successive season to be ended prematurely due to the pandemic.

== International career ==
Atkinson is eligible to represent Belize at international level through his mother and received his first call-up for the Belize national team when being named in their squad for the 2017 Copa Centroamericana. He made his debut as a 59th-minute substitute in a 3–0 defeat to Costa Rica on 15 January 2017. He made his first start two days later in Belize's 3–1 loss to El Salvador, in which he was substituted on 47 minutes. Atkinson finished the 2017 Copa Centroamericana with two appearances as Belize were eliminated after finishing bottom in the standings.

== Style of play ==
Atkinson plays as a right-back or midfielder.

== Personal life ==
Atkinson pursued a career as a physical training instructor in the Royal Air Force (RAF), starting the joining process in 2014, and has played for the RAF football team.

== Career statistics ==
=== Club ===
As of end of 2020–21 season

Appearances and goals by club, season and competition
Club	Season	League			National Cup		League Cup		Other		Total	
Club	Season	Division	Apps	Goals	Apps	Goals	Apps	Goals	Apps	Goals	Apps	Goals
York City	2012–13	League Two	0	0	0	0	0	0	0	0	0	0
York City	2013–14	League Two	0	0	—		0	0	—		0	0
York City	Total		0	0	0	0	0	0	0	0	0	0
Farsley (loan)	2012–13	Northern Premier League Division One North	2	0	—		—		—		2	0
Northallerton Town (loan)	2013–14	Northern League Division Two	1	0	—		—		—		1	0
Oxford City	2018–19	National League South	2	0	0	0	—		0	0	2	0
North Leigh	2019–20	Southern League Division One Central	4	0	—		—		0	0	4	0
North Leigh	2020–21	Southern League Division One Central	2	0	0	0	—		1 (Note: Appearance in FA Trophy)	0	3	0
North Leigh	Total		6	0	0	0	0	0	1	0	7	0
Career total			11	0	0	0	0	0	1	0	12	0

=== International ===
As of match played 25 March 2021

Appearances and goals by national team and year
National team	Year	Apps	Goals
Belize	2017	2	0
Belize	2018	3	0
Belize	2021	1	0
Total		6	0
