= 2013–14 York City F.C. season =

Association football club season

York City F.C.
2013–14 season
- Chairman: Jason McGill
- Manager: Nigel Worthington
- Ground: Bootham Crescent
- League Two: 7th
- Play-offs: Semi-final (eliminated by Fleetwood Town)
- FA Cup: First round (eliminated by Bristol Rovers)
- League Cup: First round (eliminated by Burnley)
- Football League Trophy: Second round (eliminated by Rotherham United)
- Top goalscorer: League: Wes Fletcher (10); All: Wes Fletcher (13)
- Highest home attendance: 5,225 vs Bury, League Two, 21 April 2014
- Lowest home attendance: 2,051 vs Bristol Rovers, FA Cup, 19 November 2013
- Average home league attendance: 3,773
Home colours	Away colours

The 2013–14 season was the 92nd season of competitive association football and 77th season in the Football League played by York City Football Club, a professional football club based in York, North Yorkshire, England. Their 17th-place finish in 2012–13 meant it was their second consecutive season in League Two. The season ran from 1 July 2013 to 30 June 2014.

Nigel Worthington, starting his first full season as York manager, made eight permanent summer signings. By the turn of the year York were only above the relegation zone on goal difference, before a 17-match unbeaten run saw the team finish in seventh-place in the 24-team 2013–14 League Two. This meant York qualified for the play-offs, and they were eliminated in the semi-final by Fleetwood Town. York were knocked out of the 2013–14 FA Cup, League Cup and Football League Trophy in their opening round matches.

35 players made at least one appearance in nationally organised first-team competition, and there were 12 different goalscorers. Defender Ben Davies missed only five of the 52 competitive matches played over the season. Wes Fletcher finished as leading scorer with 13 goals, of which 10 came in league competition and three came in the FA Cup. The winner of the Clubman of the Year award, voted for by the club's supporters, was Lanre Oyebanjo.

== Background and pre-season ==
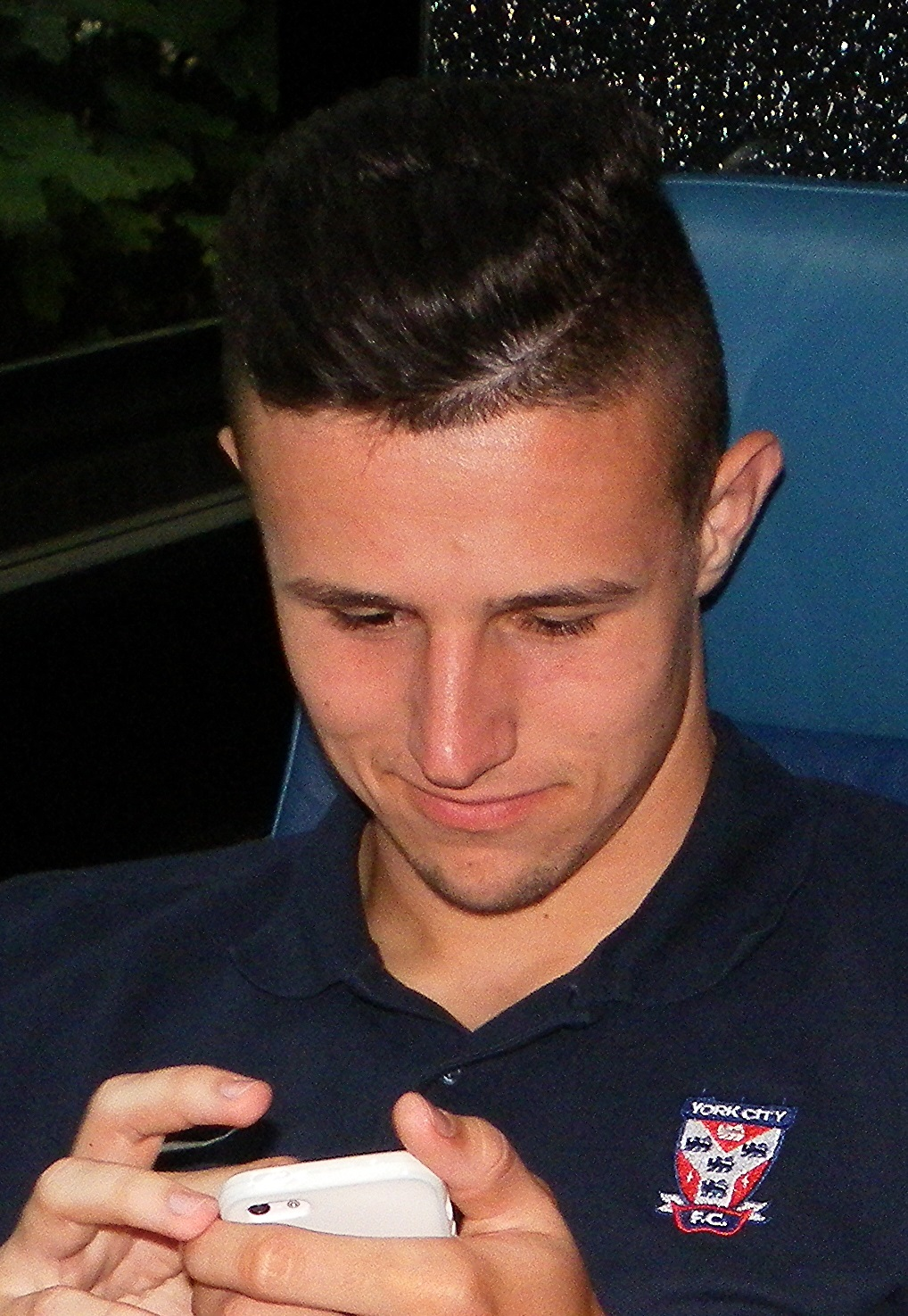
Wes Fletcher, who signed from Burnley in the summer, was York's top scorer with 13 goals.

The 2012–13 season was York City's first season back in the Football League, having won the Conference Premier play-offs in 2011–12 after eights years in the Football Conference. Manager Gary Mills was dismissed in March 2013 following an 11-match run without a victory, and was replaced by former Northern Ireland manager Nigel Worthington. Despite being in the relegation zone with three matches remaining, Worthington led the team to safety from relegation after a 1–0 win away to Dagenham & Redbridge on the final day of the season. York finished the season in 17th-place in the 2012–13 League Two table.

Following the previous season's conclusion Lee Bullock, Jon Challinor, Chris Doig, Ben Everson, Scott Kerr, David McDaid, Paddy McLaughlin, Michael Potts, Jamie Reed and Jason Walker were released by York, while Matty Blair departed for Fleetwood Town. David McGurk, Lanre Oyebanjo, Daniel Parslow, Tom Platt and Chris Smith signed new contracts with the club. New players signed ahead of the start of the season were goalkeeper Chris Kettings on a season-long loan from Blackpool, defender Ben Davies on loan from Preston North End, midfielders Craig Clay from Chesterfield and Lewis Montrose from Gillingham, winger Sander Puri from St Mirren, and strikers Ryan Bowman from Hereford United, Richard Cresswell from Sheffield United, Wes Fletcher from Burnley and Ryan Jarvis from Torquay United. Defender Mike Atkinson and striker Chris Dickinson entered the first-team squad from the youth team after agreeing professional contracts.

York retained the previous season's home and away kits. The home kit comprised red shirts with white sleeves, light blue shorts and white socks. The away kit included light blue shirts with white sleeves, white shorts and light blue socks. Benenden Health continued as shirt sponsors for the second successive season.

Pre-season match details
Date	Opponents	Venue	Result	Score F–A	Scorers	Attendance	Ref.
16 July 2013	Huddersfield Town	H	D	1–1	Fletcher 3'	1,839	
20 July 2013	Blackpool	H	D	1–1	Coulson 55'	1,510	
24 July 2013	Leicester City	H	D	0–0		1,564	
27 July 2013	Sheffield United	H	D	1–1	Bowman 79'	2,230	

== Review ==
=== August ===
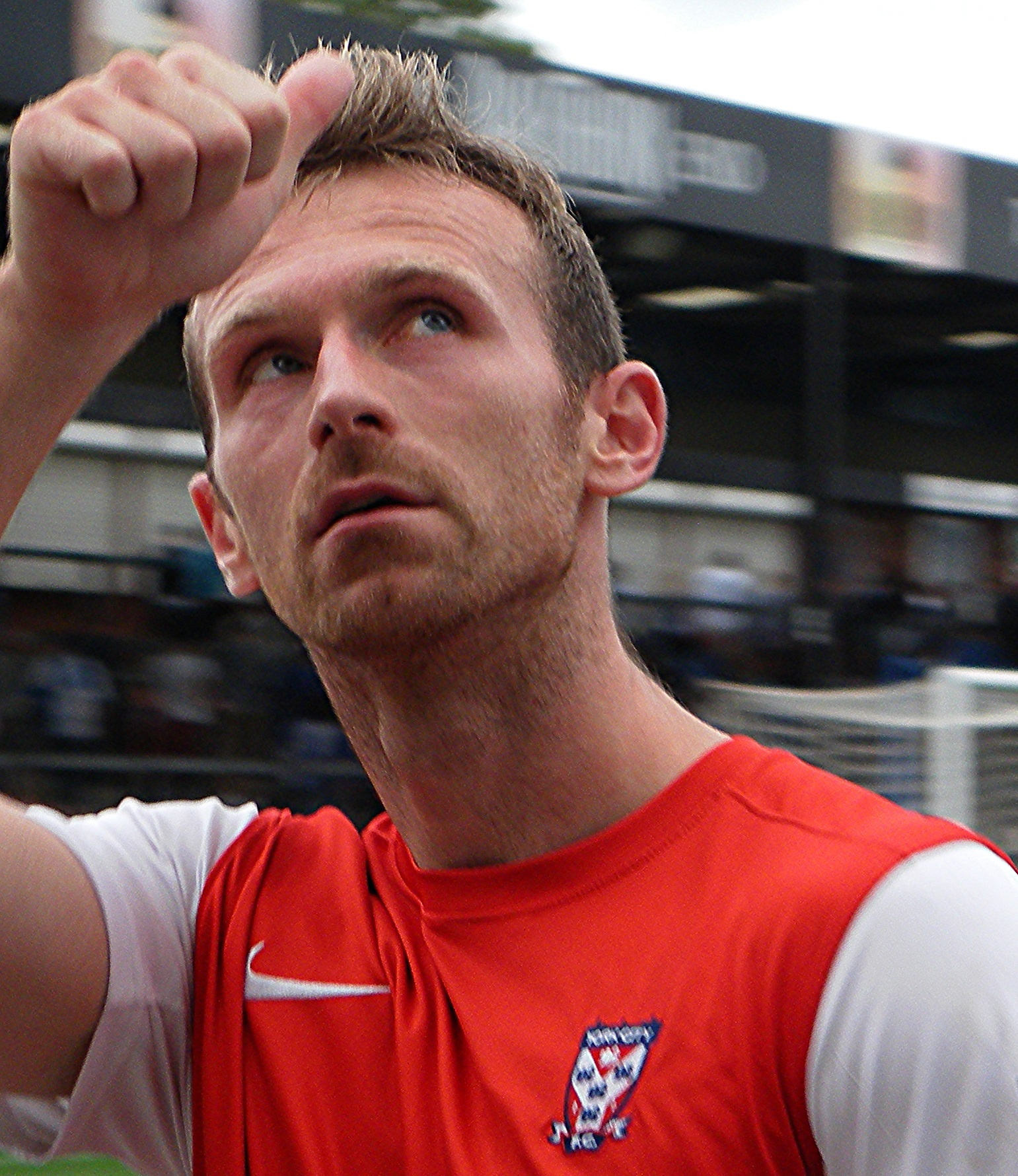
Ryan Jarvis scored all four of York's goals in August.

York began the season with a 1–0 home win over the previous season's play-off finalists, Northampton Town, with debutant Jarvis scoring the winning goal in the 90th minute. However, defeat came in York's match against Championship team Burnley in the first round of the League Cup, going down 4–0 at home. The team endured their first league defeat of the season in the following match after being beaten 2–0 away by Dagenham & Redbridge, the home team scoring in each half. York then held Hartlepool United to a 0–0 home draw, before being beaten 3–2 away by Bristol Rovers, in which Jarvis scored twice before John-Joe O'Toole scored the winning goal for the home team in the 67th minute. Two signings were made shortly before the transfer deadline; defender George Taft was signed on a one-month loan from Leicester City, while Middlesbrough midfielder Ryan Brobbel joined on a one-month loan. Midfielder John McReady, who had been told he had no future with the club, departed after signing for FC Halifax Town. Jarvis gave York the lead away to Exeter City before Alan Gow scored in each half to see the home team win 2–1.

=== September ===
York suffered their first home league defeat of the season after AFC Wimbledon won 2–0, with Michael Smith scoring in each half. Former Ipswich Town midfielder Josh Carson, who had a spell on loan with York the previous season, signed a contract until the end of 2013–14 and Sheffield United midfielder Elliott Whitehouse signed on a one-month loan. Brobbel opened the scoring in the second minute of his home debut against Mansfield Town, although the away team went on to score twice to win 2–1. York's run of four defeats ended following a 1–1 draw away to Wycombe Wanderers, in which McGurk gave York the lead before the home team levelled through Dean Morgan. Taft was sent back to Leicester after he fell behind McGurk, Parslow and Smith in the pecking order for a central defensive berth. York achieved their first win since the opening day of the season after beating Portsmouth 4–2 at home, with Fletcher (2), Montrose and Jarvis scoring.

=== October ===
Defender Luke O'Neill was signed from Burnley on a 28-day emergency loan. He made his debut in York's 3–0 win away to Torquay, which was the team's first successive win of the season. York were knocked out of the Football League Trophy in the second round after being beaten 3–0 at home by League One team Rotherham United, before their winning streak in the league was ended with a 3–0 defeat away to Newport County. York drew 2–2 away to Chesterfield, having taken a two-goal lead through O'Neill and Jarvis, before the home team fought back through Armand Gnanduillet and Jay O'Shea. The team then hosted Fleetwood Town, and the visitors won 2–0 with goals scored in each half by Gareth Evans and Jamille Matt. Scunthorpe United were beaten 4–1 at home to end York's three-match run without a win, with all the team's goals coming in the first half from Carson, Fletcher and Brobbel (2).

=== November ===
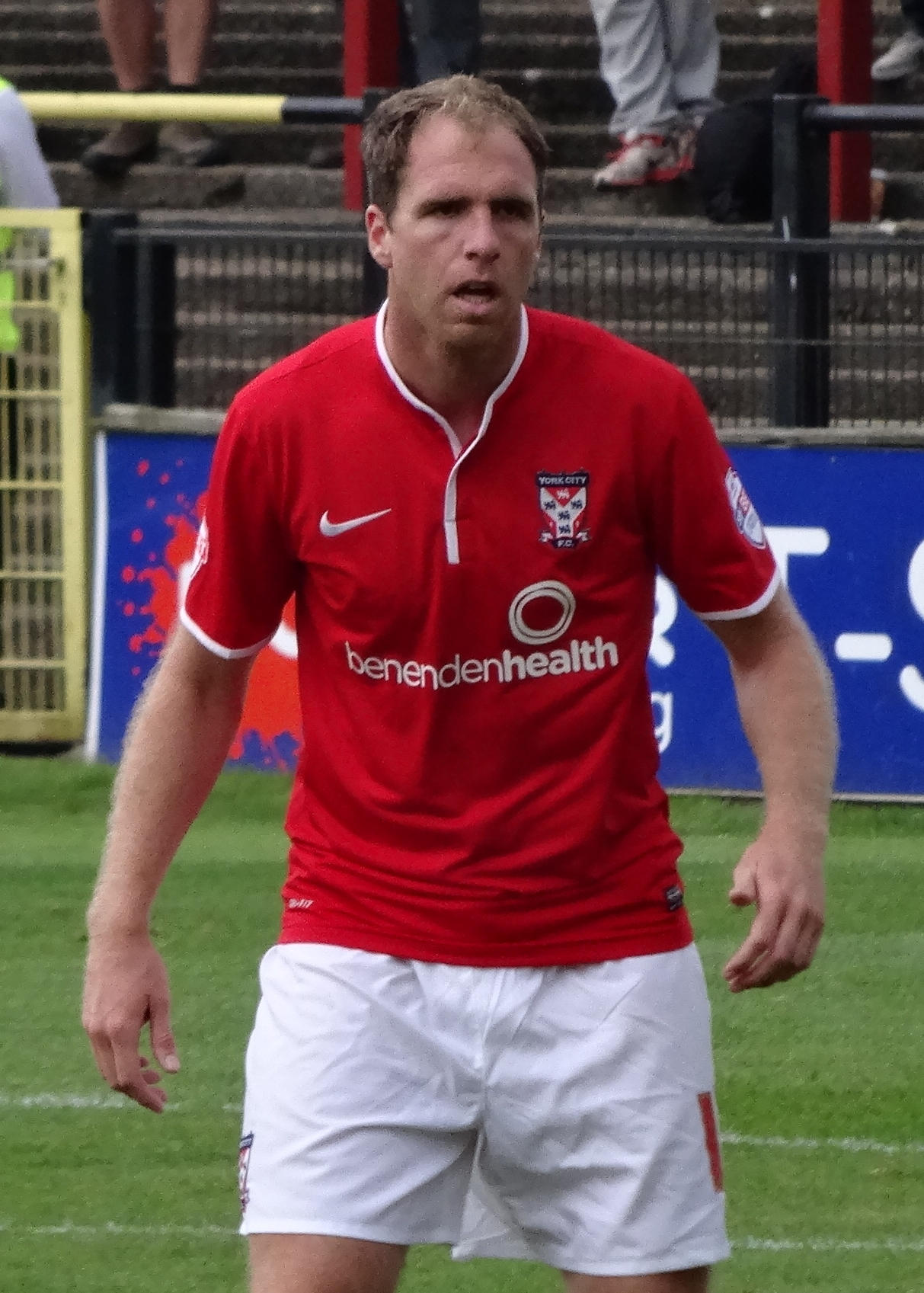
Keith Lowe was signed from divisional rivals Cheltenham Town.

Bowman scored his first goals for York away to Cheltenham Town, as York twice fought back from behind to draw 2–2. York drew 3–3 away to Bristol Rovers to earn a first round replay in the FA Cup, taking the lead through Jarvis before Eliot Richards equalised for the home team. Carson scored with a 30-yard volley to put York back in the lead, and after Bristol Rovers goals from Matt Harrold and Chris Beardsley, Fletcher scored an 86th-minute equaliser for York. Bowman scored with a header from an O'Neill cross to open the scoring at home to Plymouth Argyle, which was the first goal the visitors had conceded in 500 minutes of action. However, Plymouth equalised 11 minutes later through Tope Obadeyi and the match finished a 1–1 draw. York were knocked out of the FA Cup after losing 3–2 at home to Bristol Rovers in a first round replay; the visitors were 3–0 up by 50 minutes before Fletcher pulled two back for York with a penalty and a long-range strike.

Defender Keith Lowe, of Cheltenham, and goalkeeper Nick Pope, of Charlton Athletic, were signed on loan until January 2014. They both played in York's first league defeat in four weeks, 2–1 away, to Southend United. Kevan Hurst gave Southend the lead early into the match and Bowman equalised for York with a low strike during the second half, before Luke Prosser scored the winning goal for the home team in stoppage time. With Pope preferred in goal, Kettings returned to Blackpool on his own accord, although his loan agreement would stay in place until January 2014. York then drew 0–0 away to Morecambe. After Pope was recalled from his loan by Charlton, York signed Wolverhampton Wanderers goalkeeper Aaron McCarey on loan until January 2014. McCarey kept a clean sheet in York's 0–0 home draw with Rochdale.

=== December ===
Cresswell retired from playing as a result of an eye complaint and a knee injury. York drew 1–1 away to Burton Albion, with an own goal scored by Shane Cansdell-Sherriff giving York the lead in the 64th minute before the home team equalised eight minutes later through Billy Kee. Atkinson was released after failing to force himself into the first team and signed for Scarborough Athletic, with whom he had been on loan. York drew 0–0 at home with second-placed Oxford United, in which Carson came closest to scoring with a volley that flashed across the face of the goal. This was followed by another draw after the match awa to Accrington Stanley finished 1–1, with the home team equalising 10 minutes after a Fletcher penalty had given York the lead in the 35th minute. Striker Shaquille McDonald, who had been released by Peterborough United, was signed on a contract until the end of the season. York's last match of 2013 was a 2–1 defeat away to Bury, a result that ended York's run of consecutive draws at five. The home team were 2–0 up by the 19th minute, before Michael Coulson scored York's goal in the 73rd minute. This result meant York would begin 2014 in 22nd-position in the table, only out of the relegation zone on goal difference.

=== January ===
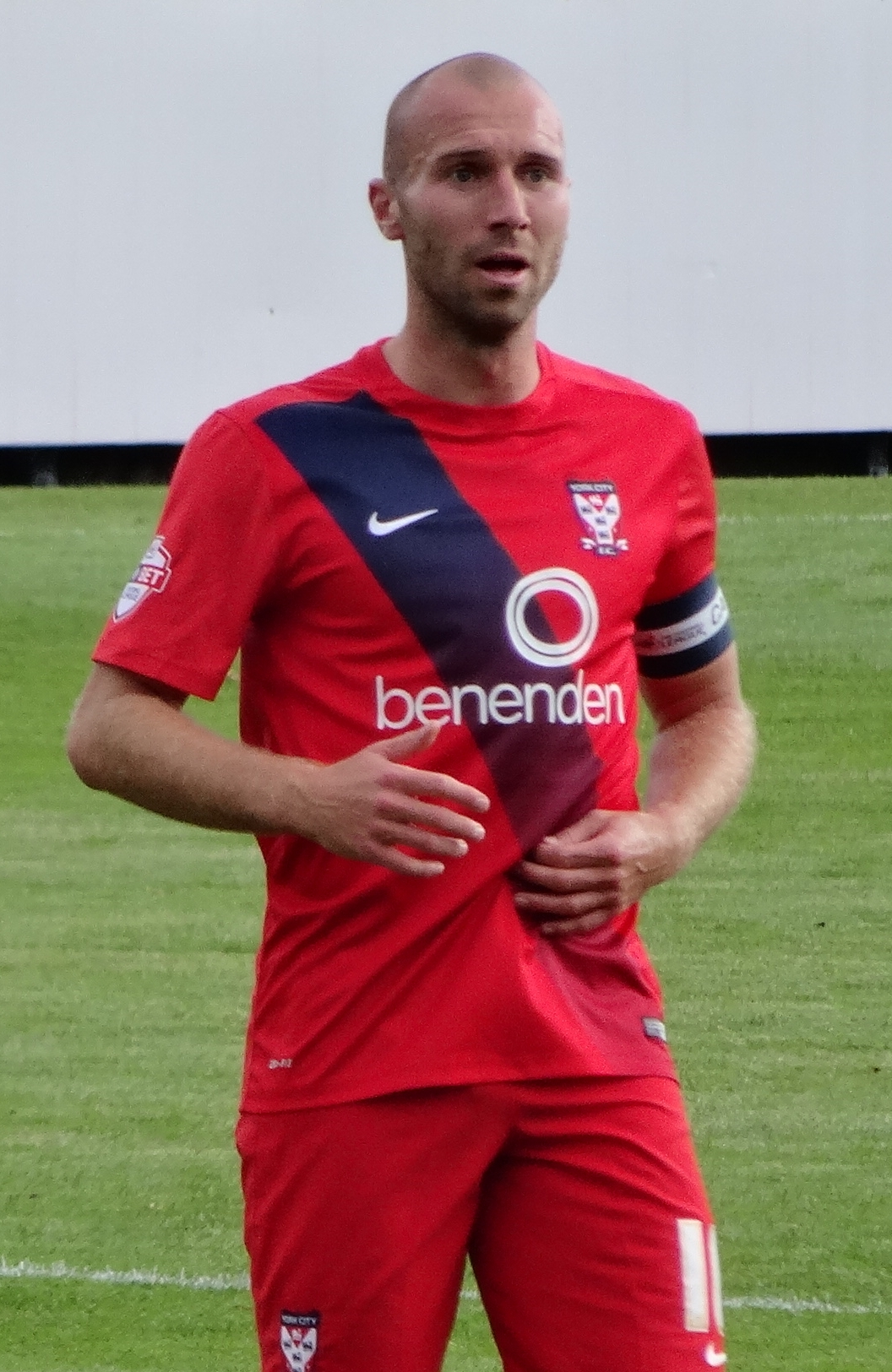
Russell Penn claimed the York captaincy shortly after signing from Cheltenham in January.

Jarvis scored the only goal in York's first win since October 2013, a 1–0 home victory over Morecambe on New Year's Day. McCarey was recalled by Wolverhampton Wanderers due to an injury to one of their goalkeepers, while O'Neill was recalled by Burnley to take part in their FA Cup match. York achieved back-to-back wins for the first time since October 2013 after Dagenham & Redbridge were beaten 3–1 at home, with Bowman opening the scoring in the second half before Fletcher scored twice. Adam Reed, who had a spell on loan with York in the previous season, was signed on a contract until the end of the season after parting company with Burton. Davies' loan was extended, while Brobbel and Whitehouse returned to their parent clubs. Cheltenham club captain Russell Penn, a midfielder, was signed on a two-and-a-half-year contract for an undisclosed fee. Lowe was subsequently signed permanently from Cheltenham on a two-and-a-half-year contract for an undisclosed fee. Having been allowed to leave the club on a free transfer, Ashley Chambers signed for Conference Premier club Cambridge United.

York achieved three successive wins for the first time in 2013–14 after beating Northampton 2–0 away, with Bowman and Fletcher scoring in three second-half minutes. Defender John McCombe was signed on a two-and-a-half-year contract following his release from Mansfield, before Clay and Jamal Fyfield left York by mutual consent. Pope returned to York on loan from Charlton for the remainder of the season. York's run of wins ended with a 0–0 draw at home to Bristol Rovers, before their first defeat of the year came after losing 2–0 away to Hartlepool. Preston winger Will Hayhurst, a Republic of Ireland under-21 international, was signed on a one-month loan. York fell to a successive defeat for the first time since September 2013 after being beaten 2–0 at home by Chesterfield. Shortly after the match, Smith left the club by mutual consent to pursue first-team football.

=== February ===
Fletcher scored a 90th-minute winner for York away to Fleetwood in a 2–1 win, a result that ended Fleetwood's five-match unbeaten run. York then drew 0–0 at home to fellow midtable team Cheltenham, before beating Plymouth 4–0 away with goals from Fletcher, McCombe (2) and Carson as the team achieved successive away wins for the first time in 2013–14. York went without scoring for a fourth consecutive home match after drawing 0–0 with Southend. Having worn the armband since an injury to McGurk, Penn was appointed captain for the rest of the season, a position that had earlier been held by Smith and Parslow.

=== March ===
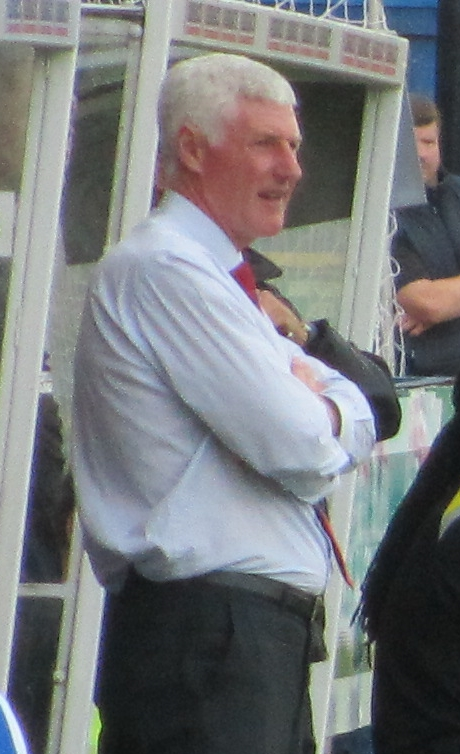
Nigel Worthington was named League Two Manager of the Month for March.

York achieved their first home win in five matches after beating Exeter 2–1, with first half goals scored by McCombe and Coulson. Hayhurst's loan was extended to the end of the season, having impressed in his six appearances for the club. Coulson scored again with the only goal, a 41st-minute header, in York's 1–0 away win over AFC Wimbledon. Bowman scored the only goal with a 32nd-minute penalty as York won 1–0 away against Mansfield, in which Fletcher missed the opportunity to extend the lead when his stoppage time penalty was saved by Alan Marriott. York moved one place outside the play-offs with a 2–0 home win over Wycombe, courtesy of a second Bowman penalty in as many matches and a Carson goal from the edge of the penalty area. Coulson scored York's only goal in a 1–0 away win over struggling Portsmouth with a low volley in the fifth minute; this result meant York moved into the play-offs in seventh-place with eight fixtures remaining.

Striker Calvin Andrew, who had been released by Mansfield in January 2014, was signed on a contract for the remainder of the season. He made his debut as a substitute in York's 1–0 home win over bottom of the table Torquay, in which Hayhurst scored the only goal in the 11th minute with an 18-yard shot that deflected off Aaron Downes. Middlesbrough winger Brobbel rejoined on loan until the end of the season, following an injury to Carson. York's run of successive wins ended on six matches after a 0–0 home draw with Burton, and this result saw York drop out of the play-offs in eighth-place. With the team recording six wins and one draw in March 2014, including six clean sheets, Worthington was named League Two Manager of the Month.

=== April ===
Pope made a number of saves as York held league leaders Rochdale to a 0–0 away draw, with a point being enough to lift the team back into seventh-place. York were prevented from equalling a club record of eight consecutive clean sheets when Accrington scored a stoppage time equaliser in a 1–1 home draw, in which York had taken earlier taken the lead with a Coulson penalty. A 1–0 win away win over Oxford, which was decided by a second half Coulson penalty, resulted in York moving one place above their opponents and back into seventh-place. York consolidated their place in a play-off position after beating Bury 1–0 at home with a fifth-minute goal scored by Lowe from a Hayhurst corner. The result meant York opened up a five-point lead over eighth-placed Oxford with two fixtures remaining. A place in the League Two play-offs was secured following a 1–0 win over Newport at home, in which Coulson scored the only goal in the 77th minute with a 25-yard free kick. Pope earned a nomination for League Two Player of the Month for April 2014, having conceded only one goal in five matches in that period.

=== May ===
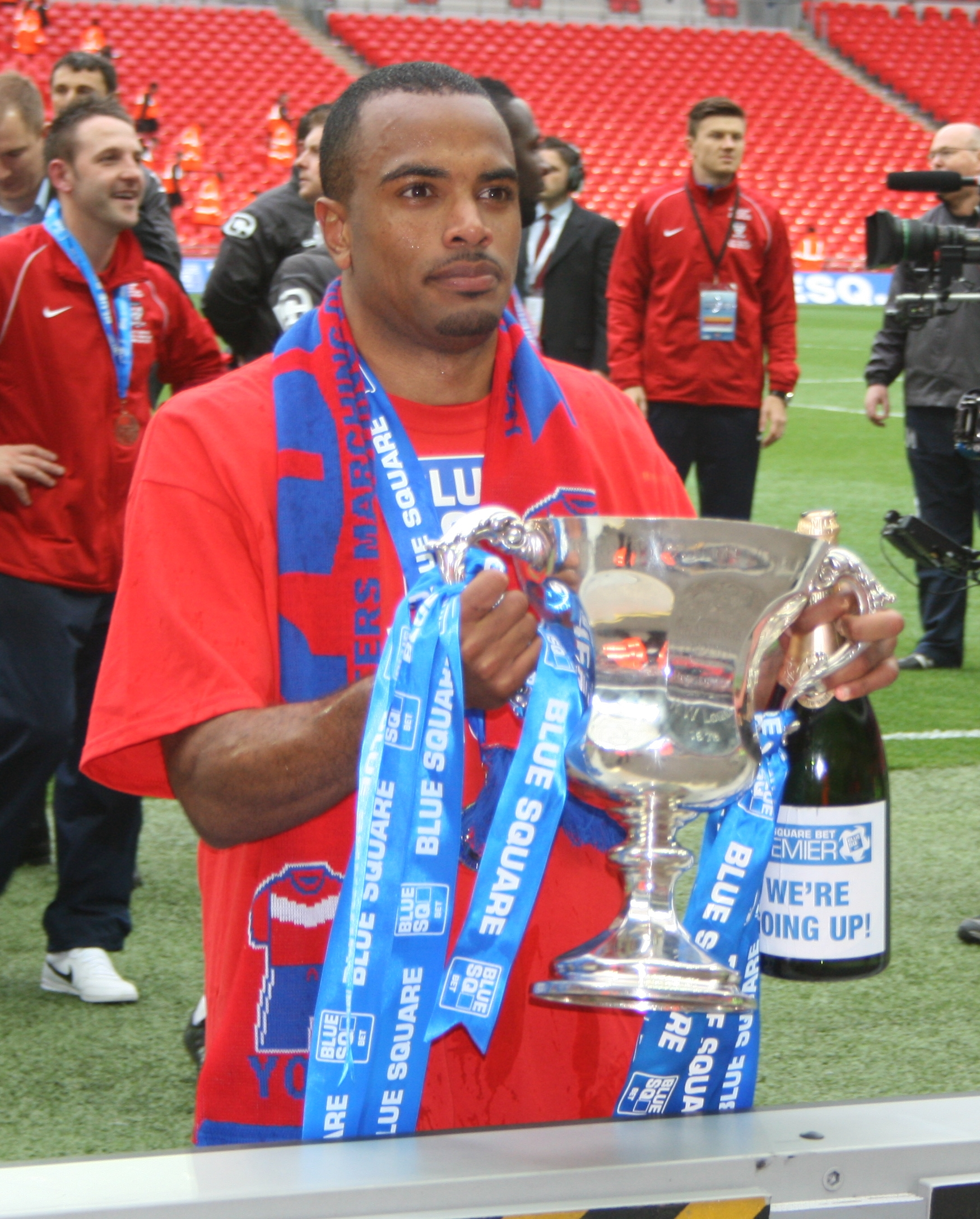
Lanre Oyebanjo was voted Clubman of the Year for 2013–14.

The league season concluded with an away match against divisional runners-up Scunthorpe; having gone two goals down York fought back to draw 2–2 with goals scored by Brobbel and Andrew. This result meant York finished the season in seventh-place in League Two, and would thus play fourth-placed Fleetwood in the play-off semi-final on the back of a 17-match unbeaten run. York lost 1–0 to Fleetwood in the first leg at home; the goal came from former York player Matty Blair in the 50th minute, who scored from close range after Antoni Sarcevic's shot was blocked on the line. A 0–0 draw away to Fleetwood in the second leg meant York were eliminated 1–0 on aggregate, ending the prospect of a second promotion in three seasons. At an awards night held at York Racecourse, Oyebanjo was voted Clubman of the Year for 2013–14.

== Summary and aftermath ==
York mostly occupied the bottom half of the table before the turn of the year, and dropped as low as 23rd in September 2013. During February 2014 the team broke into the top half of the table and with one match left were in sixth-place. York's defensive record was the third best in League Two with 41 goals conceded, bettered only by Southend (39) and Chesterfield (40). Davies made the highest number of appearances over the season, appearing in 47 of York's 52 matches. Fletcher was York's top scorer in the league and in all competitions, with 10 league goals and 13 in total. He was the only player to reach double figures, and was followed by Jarvis with nine goals.

After the season ended York released Tom Allan, Andrew, Dickinson, McDonald, Puri and Reed, while McGurk retired from professional football. Bowman and Oyebanjo left to sign for Torquay and Crawley Town respectively while Coulson signed a new contract with the club. York's summer signings included goalkeeper Jason Mooney from Tranmere Rovers, defenders Femi Ilesanmi from Dagenham, Marvin McCoy from Wycombe and Dave Winfield from Shrewsbury Town, midfielders Lindon Meikle from Mansfield, Anthony Straker from Southend and Luke Summerfield from Shrewsbury, and striker Jake Hyde from Barnet.

== Match details ==
League positions are sourced by Statto, while the remaining information is referenced individually.

=== League Two ===
League Two match details
Date	League position	Opponents	Venue	Result	Score F–A	Scorers	Attendance	Ref.
3 August 2013	8th	Northampton Town	H	W	1–0	Jarvis 90'	4,388	
10 August 2013	14th	Dagenham & Redbridge	A	L	0–2		1,487	
17 August 2013	13th	Hartlepool United	H	D	0–0		4,768	
24 August 2013	19th	Bristol Rovers	A	L	2–3	Jarvis (2) 41', 64' pen.	5,569	
31 August 2013	20th	Exeter City	A	L	1–2	Jarvis 19'	3,448	
7 September 2013	22nd	AFC Wimbledon	H	L	0–2		3,530	
14 September 2013	23rd	Mansfield Town	H	L	1–2	Brobbel 2'	3,513	
21 September 2013	22nd	Wycombe Wanderers	A	D	1–1	McGurk 64'	4,015	
28 September 2013	21st	Portsmouth	H	W	4–2	Fletcher (2) 4', 66', Montrose 58', Jarvis 64'	4,848	
5 October 2013	16th	Torquay United	A	W	3–0	Fletcher 53', Carson 67', Jarvis 73'	2,559	
19 October 2013	18th	Newport County	A	L	0–3		3,475	
22 October 2013	18th	Chesterfield	A	D	2–2	O'Neill 35', Jarvis 61'	5,907	
26 October 2013	20th	Fleetwood Town	H	L	0–2		3,523	
29 October 2013	18th	Scunthorpe United	H	W	4–1	Carson 3', Fletcher 12', Brobbel (2) 21', 40'	3,636	
2 November 2013	19th	Cheltenham Town	A	D	2–2	Bowman (2) 20', 54'	2,706	
16 November 2013	19th	Plymouth Argyle	H	D	1–1	Bowman 54'	3,803	
23 November 2013	19th	Southend United	A	L	1–2	Bowman 56'	9,018	
26 November 2013	21st	Morecambe	A	D	0–0		1,381	
30 November 2013	21st	Rochdale	H	D	0–0		3,471	
14 December 2013	20th	Burton Albion	A	D	1–1	Cansdell-Sherriff 64' o.g.	2,344	
21 December 2013	21st	Oxford United	H	D	0–0		3,526	
26 December 2013	20th	Accrington Stanley	A	D	1–1	Fletcher 35' pen.	2,009	
29 December 2013	22nd	Bury	A	L	1–2	Coulson 73'	3,706	
1 January 2014	20th	Morecambe	H	W	1–0	Jarvis 30'	3,276	
4 January 2014	17th	Dagenham & Redbridge	H	W	3–1	Bowman 52', Fletcher (2) 65', 71'	3,207	
11 January 2014	14th	Northampton Town	A	W	2–0	Bowman 68', Fletcher 70' pen.	4,448	
18 January 2014	13th	Bristol Rovers	H	D	0–0		3,514	
25 January 2014	15th	Hartlepool United	A	L	0–2		4,673	
28 January 2014	16th	Chesterfield	H	L	0–2		3,322	
1 February 2014	13th	Fleetwood Town	A	W	2–1	McLaughlin 45+2' o.g., Fletcher 90+1'	2,513	
8 February 2014	14th	Cheltenham Town	H	D	0–0		3,148	
15 February 2014	11th	Plymouth Argyle	A	W	4–0	Fletcher 12' pen., McCombe (2) 45+2', 89', Carson 90'	6,502	
22 February 2014	11th	Southend United	H	D	0–0		3,628	
1 March 2014	10th	Exeter City	H	W	2–1	McCombe 17', Coulson 27'	3,212	
8 March 2014	9th	AFC Wimbledon	A	W	1–0	Coulson 41'	4,182	
11 March 2014	9th	Mansfield Town	A	W	1–0	Bowman 32' pen.	2,865	
15 March 2014	8th	Wycombe Wanderers	H	W	2–0	Bowman 7' pen., Carson 45+1'	3,455	
22 March 2014	7th	Portsmouth	A	W	1–0	Coulson 5'	14,814	
25 March 2014	7th	Torquay United	H	W	1–0	Hayhurst 11'	3,416	
29 March 2014	8th	Burton Albion	H	D	0–0		3,988	
5 April 2014	7th	Rochdale	A	D	0–0		3,830	
12 April 2014	8th	Accrington Stanley	H	D	1–1	Coulson 61' pen.	3,855	
18 April 2014	7th	Oxford United	A	W	1–0	Coulson 48' pen.	7,118	
21 April 2014	7th	Bury	H	W	1–0	Lowe 5'	5,225	
26 April 2014	6th	Newport County	H	W	1–0	Coulson 77'	4,531	
3 May 2014	7th	Scunthorpe United	A	D	2–2	Brobbel 45+1', Andrew 71'	7,482	

=== League table (part) ===
Final League Two table (part)
Pos	Club	Pld	W	D	L	F	A	GD	Pts
5th	Southend United	46	19	15	12	56	39	+17	72
6th	Burton Albion	46	19	15	12	47	42	+5	72
7th	York City	46	18	17	11	52	41	+11	71
8th	Oxford United	46	16	14	16	53	50	+3	62
9th	Dagenham & Redbridge	46	15	15	16	53	59	−6	60
Key	Pos = League position; Pld = Matches played; W = Matches won; D = Matches drawn; L = Matches lost; F = Goals for; A = Goals against; GD = Goal difference; Pts = Points								
Source									

=== FA Cup ===
FA Cup match details
Round	Date	Opponents	Venue	Result	Score F–A	Scorers	Attendance	Ref.
First round	8 November 2013	Bristol Rovers	A	D	3–3	Jarvis 35', Carson 41', Fletcher 86'	4,654	
First round replay	19 November 2013	Bristol Rovers	H	L	2–3	Fletcher (2) 70' pen., 71'	2,051	

=== League Cup ===
League Cup match details
Round	Date	Opponents	Venue	Result	Score F–A	Scorers	Attendance	Ref.
First round	6 August 2013	Burnley	H	L	0–4		3,922	

=== Football League Trophy ===
Football League Trophy match details
Round	Date	Opponents	Venue	Result	Score F–A	Scorers	Attendance	Ref.
Second round	8 October 2013	Rotherham United	H	L	0–3		2,372	

=== League Two play-offs ===
League Two play-offs match details
Round	Date	Opponents	Venue	Result	Score F–A	Scorers	Attendance	Ref.
Semi-final first leg	12 May 2014	Fleetwood Town	H	L	0–1		5,124	
Semi-final second leg	16 May 2014	Fleetwood Town	A	D	0–0; 0–1 agg.		5,194	

== Transfers ==
=== In ===
Date	Player	Club†	Fee	Ref.
17 May 2013	Craig Clay	(Chesterfield)	Free	
17 May 2013	Ryan Jarvis	(Torquay United)	Free	
24 May 2013	Ryan Bowman	(Hereford United)	Compensation	
13 June 2013	Wes Fletcher	(Burnley)	Free	
13 June 2013	Sander Puri	(St Mirren)	Free	
28 June 2013	Lewis Montrose	(Gillingham)	Free	
16 July 2013	Richard Cresswell	(Sheffield United)	Free	
12 September 2013	Josh Carson	(Ipswich Town)	Free	
27 December 2013	Shaquille McDonald	(Peterborough United)	Free	
4 January 2014	Adam Reed	(Burton Albion)	Free	
6 January 2014	Russell Penn	Cheltenham Town	Undisclosed	
7 January 2014	Keith Lowe	Cheltenham Town	Undisclosed	
12 January 2014	John McCombe	(Mansfield Town)	Free	
24 March 2014	Calvin Andrew	(Mansfield Town)	Free	

† Brackets around club names denote the player's contract with that club had expired before he joined York.

=== Out ===
Date	Player	Club†	Fee	Ref.
30 August 2013	John McReady	FC Halifax Town	Free	
5 December 2013	Richard Cresswell	(Tadcaster Albion)	Retired	
19 December 2013	Mike Atkinson	(Scarborough Athletic)	Released	
9 January 2014	Ashley Chambers	Cambridge United	Free	
13 January 2014	Craig Clay	(FC Halifax Town)	Released	
13 January 2014	Jamal Fyfield	(Grimsby Town)	Released	
28 January 2014	Chris Smith	(FC Halifax Town)	Released	
20 May 2014	Tom Allan	(Gateshead)	Released	
20 May 2014	Calvin Andrew	(Rochdale)	Released	
20 May 2014	Chris Dickinson	(Boston United)	Released	
20 May 2014	Shaquille McDonald	(Derby County)	Released	
20 May 2014	David McGurk	(Harrogate Town)	Retired	
20 May 2014	Sander Puri	(Sligo Rovers)	Released	
20 May 2014	Adam Reed	(Darlington 1883)	Released	
4 June 2014	Lanre Oyebanjo	(Crawley Town)	Free	

† Brackets around club names denote the player joined that club after his York contract expired.

=== Loan in ===
Date	Player	Club	Return	Ref.
13 June 2013	Chris Kettings	Blackpool	5 January 2014	
19 July 2013	Ben Davies	Preston North End	End of season	
29 August 2013	George Taft	Leicester City	Terminated early 23 September 2013	
30 August 2013	Ryan Brobbel	Middlesbrough	5 January 2014	
12 September 2013	Elliott Whitehouse	Sheffield United	5 January 2014	
4 October 2013	Luke O'Neill	Burnley	Recalled 3 January 2014	
21 November 2013	Nick Pope	Charlton Athletic	Recalled 28 November 2013	
21 November 2013	Keith Lowe	Cheltenham Town	Made permanent 7 January 2014	
28 November 2013	Aaron McCarey	Wolverhampton Wanderers	Recalled 2 January 2014	
16 January 2014	Nick Pope	Charlton Athletic	End of season	
27 January 2014	Will Hayhurst	Preston North End	End of season	
27 March 2014	Ryan Brobbel	Middlesbrough	End of season	

=== Loan out ===
Date	Player	Club	Return	Ref.
1 November 2013	Chris Dickinson	Whitby Town	30 November 2013	
8 November 2013	Mike Atkinson	Scarborough Athletic	Released 19 December 2013	
21 November 2013	Tom Allan	Harrogate Town	20 December 2013	

== Appearances and goals ==
Numbers in parentheses denote appearances as substitute.
Players with names struck through and marked † left the club during the playing season.
Players with names in italics and marked * were on loan from another club for the whole of their season with York.
Players listed with no appearances have been in the matchday squad but only as unused substitutes.
Key to positions: GK – Goalkeeper; DF – Defender; MF – Midfielder; FW – Forward

Players included in matchday squads
No.	Pos.	Nat.	Name	League		FA Cup		League Cup		FL Trophy		Play-offs		Total		Discipline	
No.	Pos.	Nat.	Name	Apps	Goals	Apps	Goals	Apps	Goals	Apps	Goals	Apps	Goals	Apps	Goals	A yellow rectangle, denoting the yellow penalty card shown to a player being cautioned	A red rectangle, denoting the red penalty card shown to a player being sent off
1	GK	SCO	~~Chris Kettings~~ * †	0	0	1	0	0	0	0	0	0	0	1	0	0	0
2	DF	IRL	Lanre Oyebanjo	41	0	2	0	1	0	0	0	2	0	46	0	7	0
3	DF	ENG	Ben Davies *	44	0	0	0	0	0	1	0	2	0	47	0	4	0
4	DF	ENG	~~Chris Smith~~ †	8 (1)	0	2	0	1	0	1	0	0	0	12 (1)	0	4	0
5	DF	ENG	David McGurk	21 (2)	1	0 (1)	0	1	0	0	0	0	0	22 (3)	1	4	0
6	DF	WAL	Daniel Parslow	13	0	2	0	0	0	1	0	0	0	16	0	1	0
7	MF	ENG	Michael Coulson	22 (11)	7	0	0	0 (1)	0	0	0	2	0	24 (12)	7	2	0
8	MF	ENG	~~Craig Clay~~ †	6 (2)	0	1	0	1	0	0	0	0	0	8 (2)	0	1	0
8	FW	ENG	Calvin Andrew	5 (3)	1	0	0	0	0	0	0	2	0	7 (3)	1	2	0
9	FW	ENG	Wes Fletcher	24 (8)	10	1 (1)	3	0 (1)	0	1	0	0	0	26 (10)	13	0	0
10	MF	ENG	~~Ashley Chambers~~ †	8 (7)	0	0 (1)	0	1	0	1	0	0	0	10 (8)	0	1	0
10	MF	ENG	Russell Penn	21	0	0	0	0	0	0	0	2	0	23	0	4	0
11	FW	ENG	Ryan Jarvis	21 (14)	8	2	1	1	0	1	0	0 (1)	0	25 (15)	9	2	0
12	MF	NIR	Josh Carson	29 (2)	4	1	1	0	0	0	0	0	0	30 (2)	5	5	0
14	MF	ENG	Lewis Montrose	26 (7)	1	1	0	0 (1)	0	1	0	0 (1)	0	28 (9)	1	11	0
15	DF	ENG	Keith Lowe	30	1	0	0	0	0	0	0	2	0	32	1	5	0
16	DF	ENG	~~Jamal Fyfield~~ †	1 (1)	0	2	0	1	0	0	0	0	0	4 (1)	0	2	0
16	DF	ENG	John McCombe	18 (1)	3	0	0	0	0	0	0	2	0	20 (1)	3	4	0
17	FW	ENG	~~Richard Cresswell~~ †	3 (3)	0	0 (1)	0	0	0	0 (1)	0	0	0	3 (5)	0	1	1
17	FW	ENG	Shaquille McDonald	0	0	0	0	0	0	0	0	0	0	0	0	0	0
18	MF	ENG	Tom Platt	11 (9)	0	1	0	1	0	1	0	0	0	14 (9)	0	2	0
19	FW	ENG	Ryan Bowman	22 (15)	8	2	0	1	0	0 (1)	0	1 (1)	0	26 (17)	8	2	2
20	DF	ENG	Tom Allan	4 (1)	0	0	0	0	0	0	0	0 (1)	0	4 (2)	0	0	0
21	MF	ENG	Harry Coates	0	0	0	0	0	0	0	0	0	0	0	0	0	0
22	FW	ENG	Tom Chamberlain	0 (2)	0	0	0	0	0	0	0	0	0	0 (2)	0	0	0
23	DF	ENG	~~George Taft~~ * †	2 (1)	0	0	0	0	0	0	0	0	0	2 (1)	0	0	0
23	MF	ENG	Cameron Murray	0	0	0	0	0	0	0 (1)	0	0	0	0 (1)	0	0	0
24	GK	NIR	Michael Ingham	19	0	1	0	1	0	1	0	0	0	22	0	0	0
25	FW	ENG	Chris Dickinson	0 (2)	0	0	0	0	0	0	0	0	0	0 (2)	0	0	0
26	DF	ENG	~~Mike Atkinson~~ †	0	0	0	0	0	0	0	0	0	0	0	0	0	0
26	MF	IRL	Will Hayhurst *	14 (4)	1	0	0	0	0	0	0	2	0	16 (4)	1	2	0
27	MF	NIR	Ryan Brobbel *	16 (3)	4	0 (1)	0	0	0	0	0	1	0	17 (4)	4	0	0
28	MF	EST	Sander Puri	3 (5)	0	1 (1)	0	1	0	0	0	0	0	5 (6)	0	0	0
29	MF	ENG	~~Elliott Whitehouse~~ * †	15	0	2	0	0	0	1	0	0	0	18	0	5	0
30	DF	ENG	~~Luke O'Neill~~ * †	15	1	0	0	0	0	1	0	0	0	16	1	4	0
31	GK	ENG	Nick Pope *	22	0	0	0	0	0	0	0	2	0	24	0	0	0
32	GK	IRL	~~Aaron McCarey~~ * †	5	0	0	0	0	0	0	0	0	0	5	0	0	0
37	MF	ENG	Adam Reed	17 (2)	0	0	0	0	0	0	0	2	0	19 (2)	0	4	0

Players not included in matchday squads
No.	Pos.	Nat.	Name
15	MF	ENG	~~John McReady~~ †

== See also ==
- List of York City F.C. seasons
