= Chamberlayne baronets =

Extinct baronetcy in the Baronetage of England

The Chamberlayne Baronetcy of Wickham, Oxfordshire was created for Thomas Chamberlayne in the Baronetage of England on 4 February 1643. He was appointed High Sheriff of Oxfordshire for 1643.

== Chamberlayne baronets of Wickham, Oxfordshire (1643) ==
- Sir Thomas Chamberlayne, 1st Baronet (died 6 October 1643)
- Revd Sir Thomas Chamberlayne, 2nd Baronet (c. 1635–1682)
- Sir James Chamberlayne, 3rd Baronet (c.1640–October 1699)
- Sir James Chamberlayne, 4th Baronet (died 23 December 1767)
- Sir Henry Chamberlayne, 5th Baronet (died 25 January 1776) Baronetcy extinct on his death.
