= Will Hayhurst =

English-Irish footballer

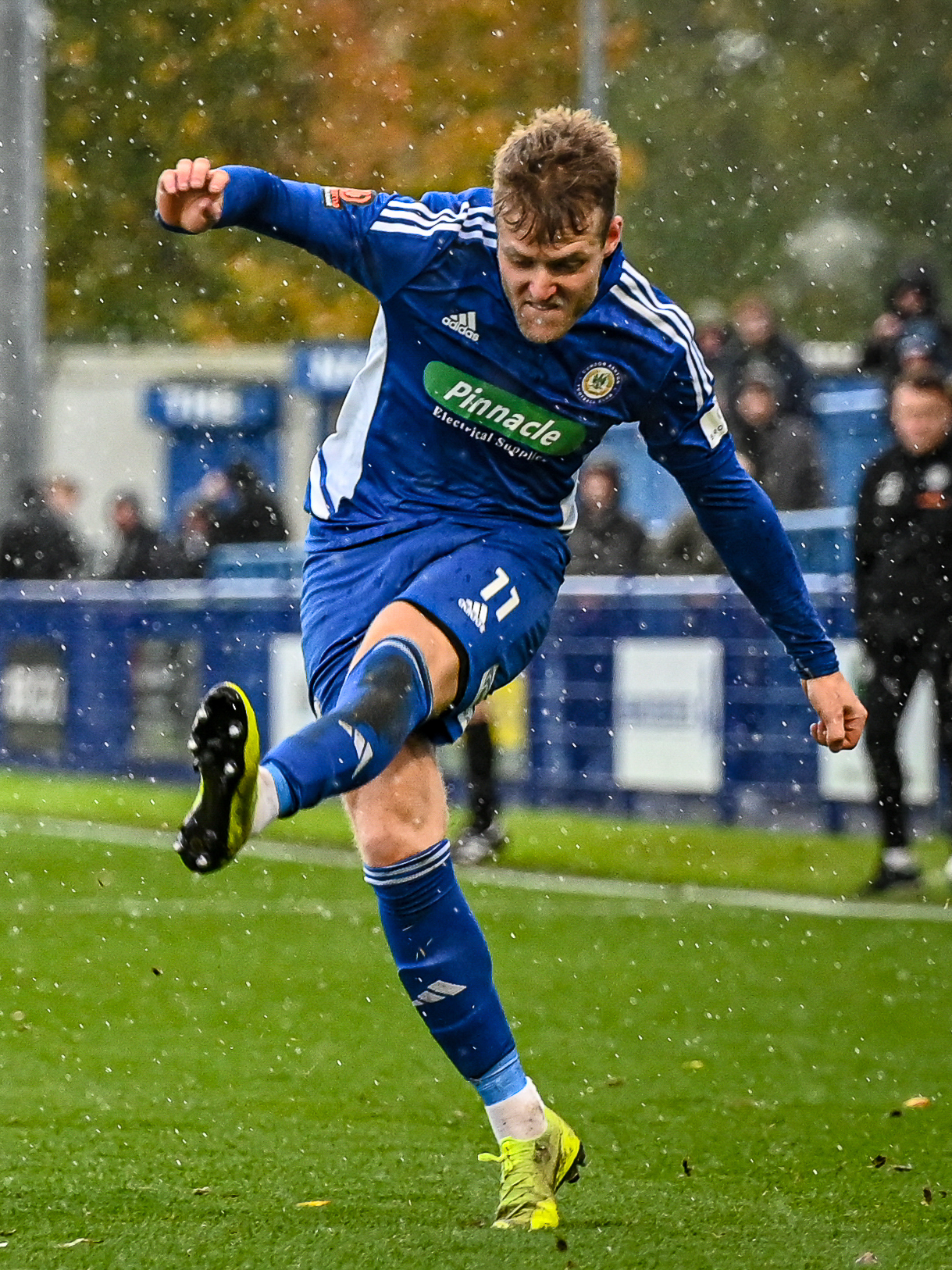
- Hayhurst playing for Curzon Ashton in 2023

Personal information
- Full name: William Hayhurst
- Date of birth: 24 February 1994 (age 32)
- Place of birth: Longridge, England
- Height: 5 ft 10 in (1.78 m)
- Position: Winger

Team information
- Current team: Curzon Ashton
- Number: 11

Youth career
- –2012: Preston North End

Senior career*
Years	Team	Apps	(Gls)
2012–2015	Preston North End	36	(4)
2014	→ York City (loan)	18	(1)
2015–2016	Notts County	12	(0)
2017–2018	Warrington Town		
2018–2022	Farsley Celtic (Note: Stats for the 2018–19 season are incomplete.)	101	(21)
2022–	Curzon Ashton	9	(1)

International career
2013	Republic of Ireland U19	2	(0)
2013	Republic of Ireland U21	2	(0)
- * Club domestic league appearances and goals as of 23:25, 24 September 2022 (UTC)

William Hayhurst (born 24 February 1994) is an English-Irish professional footballer who plays as a winger, who plays for Curzon Ashton.

== Club career ==
=== Preston North End ===
Hayhurst was born in Longridge on 24 February 1994, and grew up supporting Preston North End. He played for Longridge Town before joining Preston North End U14. There, Hayhurst started his career in the youth system at Preston, and while in the club's academy, Hayhurst suffered an injuries setback, which he broke both of his leg. Hayhurst initially thought that injuries could have cost him getting a professional contract. Eventually, Hayhurst signed a two-year apprenticeship in the summer of 2010.

On 28 April 2012, Hayhurst made his professional debut in a 2–2 draw with Charlton Athletic, coming on as a late substitute for David Gray. His second appearance for Preston North End came in the last game of the season against Bournemouth, starting a match and played 36 minutes before suffering an injury and was substituted, as the club lost 1–0. At the end of the 2011–12 season, he made two appearances in all competitions.

At the start of the 2012–13 season, Hayhurst made his first appearance of the season against Crystal Palace in the second round of the League Cup. He then found himself in and out of the first team throughout the first half of the season. In a match against Yeovil Town on 29 September 2012, Hayhurt set up Preston North End's first goal of the game, in a 3–2 win. On 23 February 2013, he scored his first goal for the club, in a 1–1 draw against Swindon Town. This was followed up by scoring in a 1–1 draw away to Milton Keynes Dons on 2 March 2013 and a 2–0 win over Stevenage on 9 March 2013, to make it three goals in three appearances for Hayhurst. Following this, Hayhurst received a handful appearance in the first team for the rest of the 2012–13 season. He later had his fourth goal for the club on 9 April 2013, in a 2–0 win over Oldham Athletic. On 18 April 2013, the club activated their options to extend Hayhurst's contract for another year. At the end of the 2012–13 season, he made twenty–five appearances and scoring once in all competitions. Following this, Hayhurst signed a new two-year contract with the club in June 2013. Hayhurst described signing a new contract with the club as "living the dream".

In the 2013–14 season, Hayhurst, however, found his first team opportunities at Preston North End, due to competitions in the midfield positions. As a result, he only made three starts for the side. Having never played for Preston North End for two months, Hayhurst made his return to the first team, coming on as a 66th-minute substitute, and set up the club's second goal of the game for Joe Garner, who scored twice, in a 2–0 win against Port Vale on 26 November 2013. By the time he departed from Preston North End, Hayhurst made ten appearances in all competitions.

In the 2014–15 season, Hayhurst continued to find his first team opportunities at Preston North End, due to competitions in the midfield positions. But he, once again, made five starts for the side. By the time Hayhurst departed from the club, he made eleven appearances for the side.

After leaving Preston North End, Hayhurst said: "One of the toughest decisions I knew I would ever have to make was leaving Preston. I felt that for myself personally I had to play more games than I was getting at my age. Being a Preston fan as a boy, it was always my dream to one day play for them. I never expected to play as much as I did so young, but I loved every minute of it. Making my family proud was a huge thing for me, so with them supporting Preston as well it was a great feeling."

==== York City (loan) ====
Hayhurst joined League Two club York City on 27 January 2014 on a one-month loan, making his debut the following day as a 55th-minute substitute for Lanre Oyebanjo in a 2–0 home defeat to Chesterfield.

Since joining the club, he quickly became a first team regular for the side, playing in the midfield position. On 3 March 2014, Hayhurst extended his loan spell with York until the end of 2013–14 season. He then scored his first York goal, in a 1–0 win over Torquay United on 25 March 2014. His second goal for the club came in the last game of the season, in a 2–2 draw against Scunthorpe United. Hayhurst played in both of the semi–final play–offs against Fleetwood Town, as York City lost 1–0 on aggregate. He went on to make 18 appearances for York City. Following this, Hayhurst returned to his parent club.

=== Notts County ===
On 13 January 2015, Hayhurst signed for Notts County on an 18-month contract. Upon joining Notts County, Hayhurst stated joining the club could help him gain fitness, having appeared less in the first half of the season at Preston.

Hayhurst made his Notts County debut four days later on 17 January 2015, in a 2–1 win over Crewe Alexandra. He appeared in the next six matches for the club. However, Hayhurst's playing time was reduced by finding himself placed on the substitute bench for the rest of the 2014–15 season. In a match against Barnsley on 14 April 2015, he came on as a late minute substitute and set up the equalising goal for Bálint Bajner, in a 1–1 draw. At the end of the 2014–15 season, Hayhurst went on to make twelve appearances in all competitions.

Ahead of the 2015–16 season, Hayhurst was placed on a transfer list under the new management of Ricardo Moniz. However, he made no appearances for Notts County throughout the season, due to suffering an anterior cruciate ligament injury (ACL) against Carlton Town in pre-season. Hayhurst was released by the club at the end of 2015–16.

=== Brief Retirement/Warrington ===
Following his release by Notts County, Hayhurst continued to recover his ACL. However, his failure of recovery resulting in him retirement from professional football at age twenty–three and work in the property business. This only proved to be temporary, as he returned to playing and joined both Southport and Warrington Town. His time at Warrington Town saw him became a first team regular for the side.

=== Farsley Celtic ===
It was announced on 24 May 2018 that Hayhurst signed for Farsley Celtic.

Hayhurst quickly established himself in the starting eleven for Farsley Celtic and helped the club win the 2018–19's Northern Premier League champions. At the end of the 2018–19 season, it was announced on 18 May 2019 that Hayhurst signed a contract extension with the club.

The first half of the 2019–20 season saw Hayhurst continuing to be in the first team, as well as, scoring goals regularly for Farsley Celtic. At the end of the 2019–20 season, which was suspended halfway through the season due to COVID-19 pandemic, Hayhurst signed a contract extension with the club.

=== Curzon Ashton ===
In the summer of 2022, he signed for National League North side Curzon Ashton on a free transfer, re-uniting with manager, Adam Lakeland, who he had played under at Farsley Celtic.

== International career ==
Though Hayhurst was born in England, Hayhurst was eligible to play for the Republic of Ireland national team through his grandmother. Hayhurst revealed that he made no appearances for the Republic of Ireland national under-17 team because of a leg injury, prevented him from making his Ireland U17 debut.

Hayhurst was called up to the Republic of Ireland under-19 team for the games of the Elite Round of the UEFA U19 Championship qualifying campaign. He was capped twice at this level, with his debut coming in a 2–2 draw with Switzerland on 6 June 2013. Following this, the national side's U19 Manager Paul Doolin praised his performance.

Hayhurst was then called up by Republic of Ireland under-21 team in October 2013. He made his debut as a seventieth-minute substitute in a 1–0 home defeat to Romania on 15 October 2013; this was the first of two caps at under-21 level.

== Career statistics ==
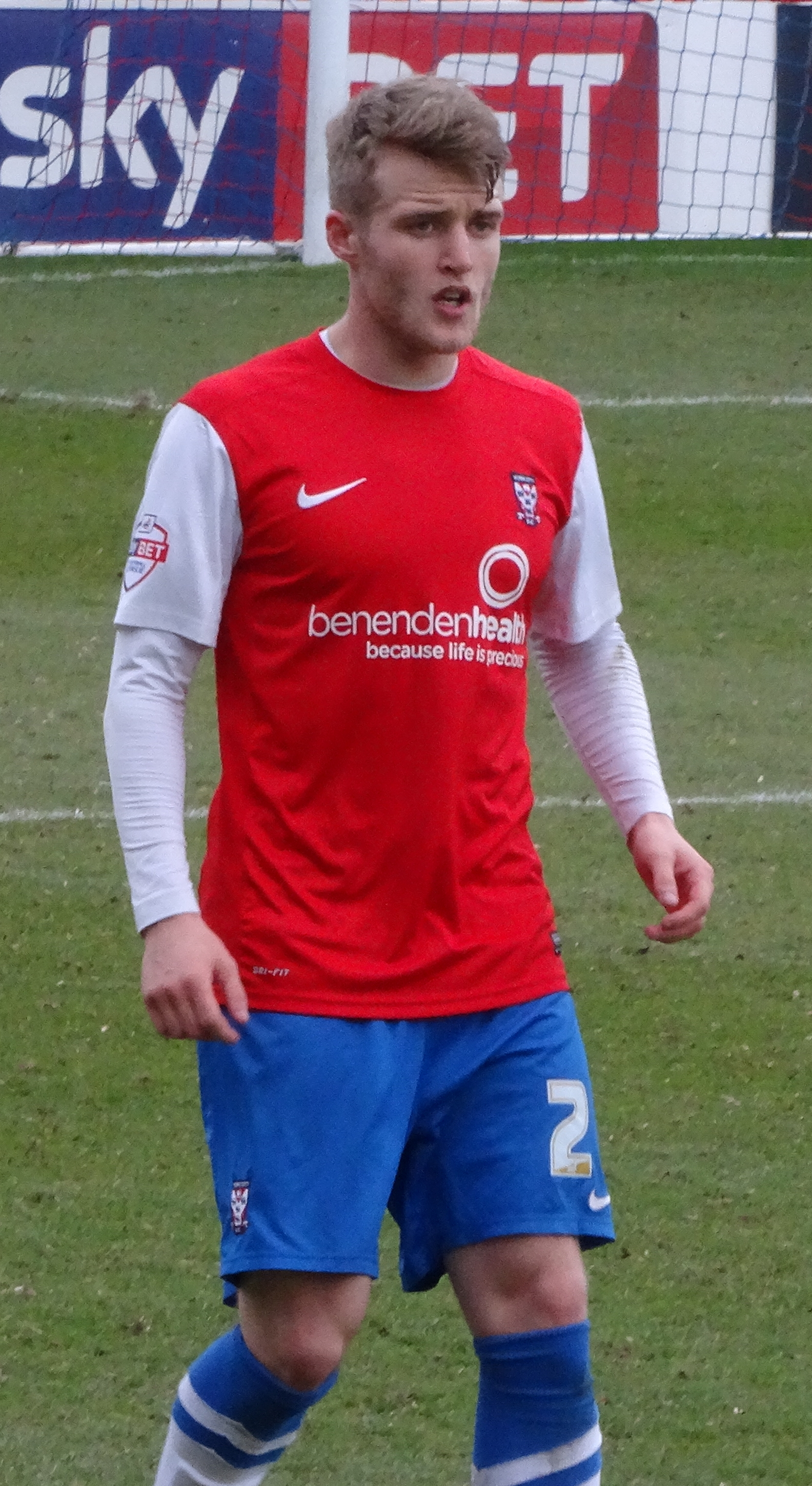
Hayhurst playing for York City in 2014

As of match played 24 September 2022

Appearances and goals by club, season and competition
Club	Season	League			FA Cup		League Cup		Other		Total	
Club	Season	Division	Apps	Goals	Apps	Goals	Apps	Goals	Apps	Goals	Apps	Goals
Preston North End	2011–12	League One	2	0	0	0	0	0	0	0	2	0
Preston North End	2012–13	League One	21	4	0	0	2	0	2 (Note: Appearances in Football League Trophy)	0	25	4
Preston North End	2013–14	League One	6	0	3	0	1	0	0	0	10	0
Preston North End	2014–15	League One	7	0	0	0	2	0	2	0	11	0
Preston North End	Total		36	4	3	0	5	0	4	0	48	4
York City (loan)	2013–14	League Two	18	1	—		—		2 (Note: Appearances in League Two play-offs)	0	20	1
Notts County	2014–15	League One	12	0	—		—		—		12	0
Notts County	2015–16	League One	0	0	0	0	0	0	0	0	0	0
Notts County	Total		12	0	0	0	0	0	0	0	12	0
Farsley Celtic	2018–19	NPL Premier Division	16	3	1	0	—		4 (Note: Two appearances in League Challenge Cup, two in FA Trophy)	0	21	3
Farsley Celtic	2019–20	National League North	33	9	1	0	—		5 (Note: Appearances in FA Trophy)	0	39	9
Farsley Celtic	2020–21	National League North	14	3	1	0	—		2	0	17	3
Farsley Celtic	2021–22	National League North	38	6	1	0	—		2	0	41	6
Farsley Celtic	Total		101	21	4	0	—		13	0	118	21
Curzon Ashton	2022–23	National League North	9	1	1	1	—		0	0	10	2
Career total			176	27	8	1	5	0	19	0	208	28

== Personal life ==
In June 2013, Hayhurst talked about his daily life as a footballer for four days on Preston North End's website.

== Honours ==
Individual

- National League North Player of the Month: August 2023
