= Tom Chamberlain (footballer, born 1996) =

English footballer (born 1996)

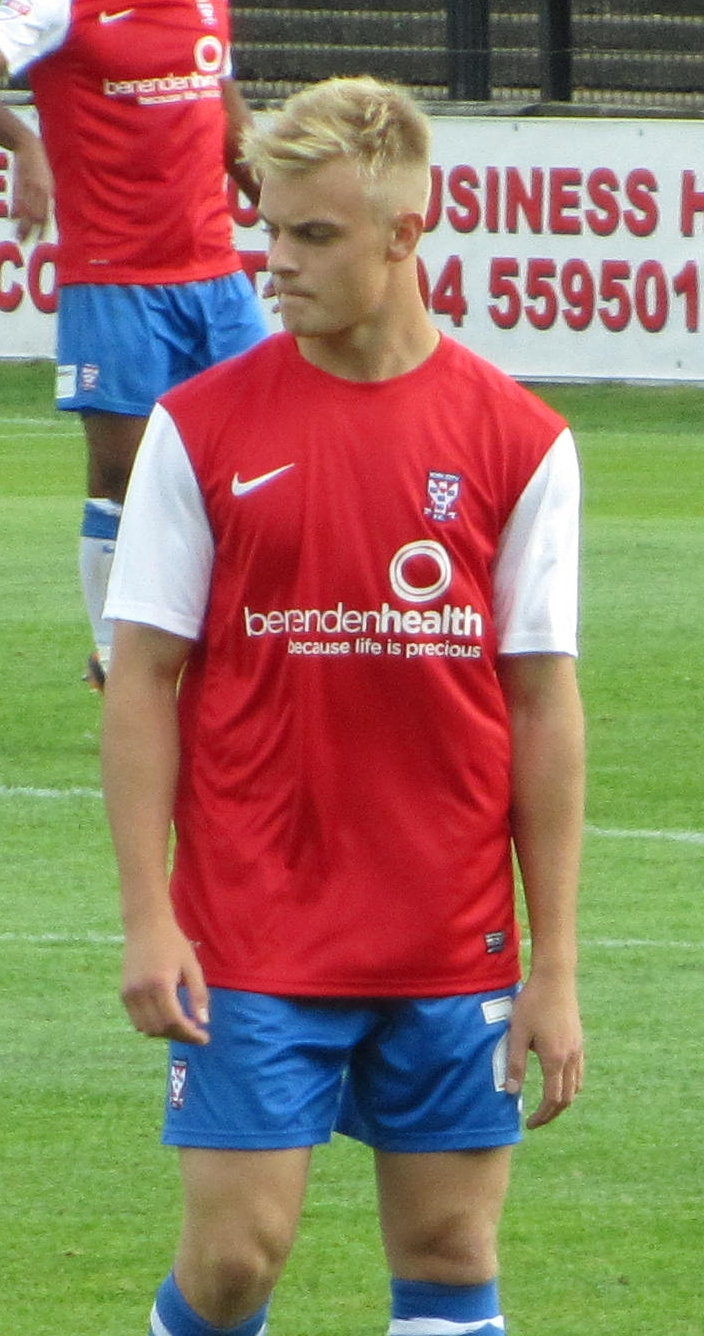
- Chamberlain playing for York City in 2013

Personal information
- Full name: Thomas Liam Chamberlain
- Date of birth: 23 May 1996 (age 30)
- Place of birth: Scarborough, England
- Height: 5 ft 11 in (1.80 m)
- Positions: Striker; winger

Team information
- Current team: Selby Town

Youth career
- 2012–2013: York City

Senior career*
Years	Team	Apps	(Gls)
2013–2014	York City	2	(0)
2014	Tadcaster Albion		
2014–2015	Pickering Town		
2015–	Selby Town		
- * Club domestic league appearances and goals as of 13:30, 1 June 2015 (UTC)

Thomas Liam Chamberlain (born 23 May 1996) is an English semi-professional footballer who plays as a striker or a winger for Northern Counties East League Division One club Selby Town.

== Career ==
Born in Scarborough, North Yorkshire, Chamberlain joined York City's youth system as a first-year trainee in 2012. He made his first-team debut on 31 August 2013 aged 17, as an 82nd-minute substitute for Lewis Montrose in a 2–1 away defeat to Exeter City in League Two. He left York in April 2014. After a spell with Northern Counties East League Premier Division club Tadcaster Albion, Chamberlain signed for their divisional rivals Pickering Town on 11 November 2014. He stayed with Pickering for two months before joining Northern Counties East League Division One club Selby Town on 21 January 2015.

== Career statistics ==
As of match played 7 September 2013

Appearances and goals by club, season and competition
Club	Season	League			FA Cup		League Cup		Other		Total	
Club	Season	Division	Apps	Goals	Apps	Goals	Apps	Goals	Apps	Goals	Apps	Goals
York City	2013–14	League Two	2	0	0	0	0	0	0	0	2	0
Career total			2	0	0	0	0	0	0	0	2	0
