= Josh Carson =

Northern Irish footballer (born 1993)

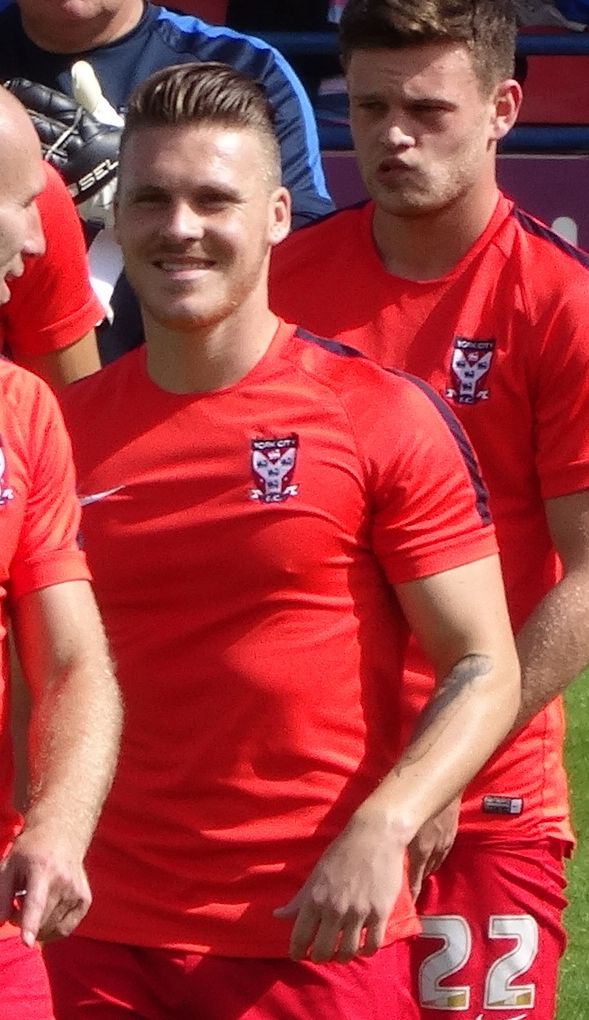
- Carson warming up for York City in 2015

Personal information
- Full name: Joshua Glyn Carson
- Date of birth: 3 June 1993 (age 33)
- Place of birth: Ballymena, Northern Ireland
- Height: 5 ft 9 in (1.75 m)
- Positions: Midfielder; winger

Team information
- Current team: Moyola Park
- Number: 42

Youth career
- 2009–2010: Ipswich Town

Senior career*
Years	Team	Apps	(Gls)
2010–2013	Ipswich Town	31	(5)
2013	→ York City (loan)	5	(0)
2013–2016	York City	75	(7)
2016–2017	Linfield	13	(2)
2017–2024	Coleraine	214	(25)
2024–2025	Ballymena United	27	(0)
2026	Portadown	13	(0)
2026–	Moyola Park	3	(1)

International career^{‡}
	Northern Ireland U16	5	(1)
	Northern Ireland U17	12	(4)
	Northern Ireland U18	2	(1)
	Northern Ireland U19	7	(1)
2010–2013	Northern Ireland U21	12	(0)
2011–2012	Northern Ireland	4	(0)
- * Club domestic league appearances and goals as of 29 April 2026 ‡ National team caps and goals as of 14:47, 20 February 2018 (UTC)

Joshua Glyn Carson (born 3 June 1993) is a Northern Irish footballer who plays as a midfielder for NIFL Championship club Moyola Park.

Carson started his career with Ipswich Town's youth system in February 2009, before signing a professional contract in July 2010. He broke into the first team during the 2010–11 season, and was loaned to League Two club York City in March 2013. After being released by Ipswich, Carson joined York permanently in September 2013. He remained with York for three seasons before his release in 2016.

== Club career ==
=== Ipswich Town ===
Carson played for Greenisland Boys before joining the Ipswich Town academy in February 2009. He signed a two-year professional contract at Portman Road in July 2010. He made his first-team debut for Ipswich on 19 March 2011 in the home match against Scunthorpe United. Carson scored his first two senior goals on his third senior appearance for Ipswich in a 2–1 victory against Crystal Palace, at Portman Road on 9 April 2011. He added to his tally by netting his third goal within a week, as Ipswich beat Bristol City 1–0.

In February 2012, Carson signed a new two-year contract, with the option of a further year, at Ipswich. He joined League Two club York City on 14 March 2013 on a one-month loan, making his debut in a 2–0 home defeat to Port Vale two days later. Having made five appearances for York. he was ruled out for the remainder of the season with a broken foot, returning to Ipswich at the end of his loan. He was released by Ipswich after his contract was cancelled by mutual consent on 2 September 2013, following trials with Bristol City, Notts County and Hibernian.

=== York City ===
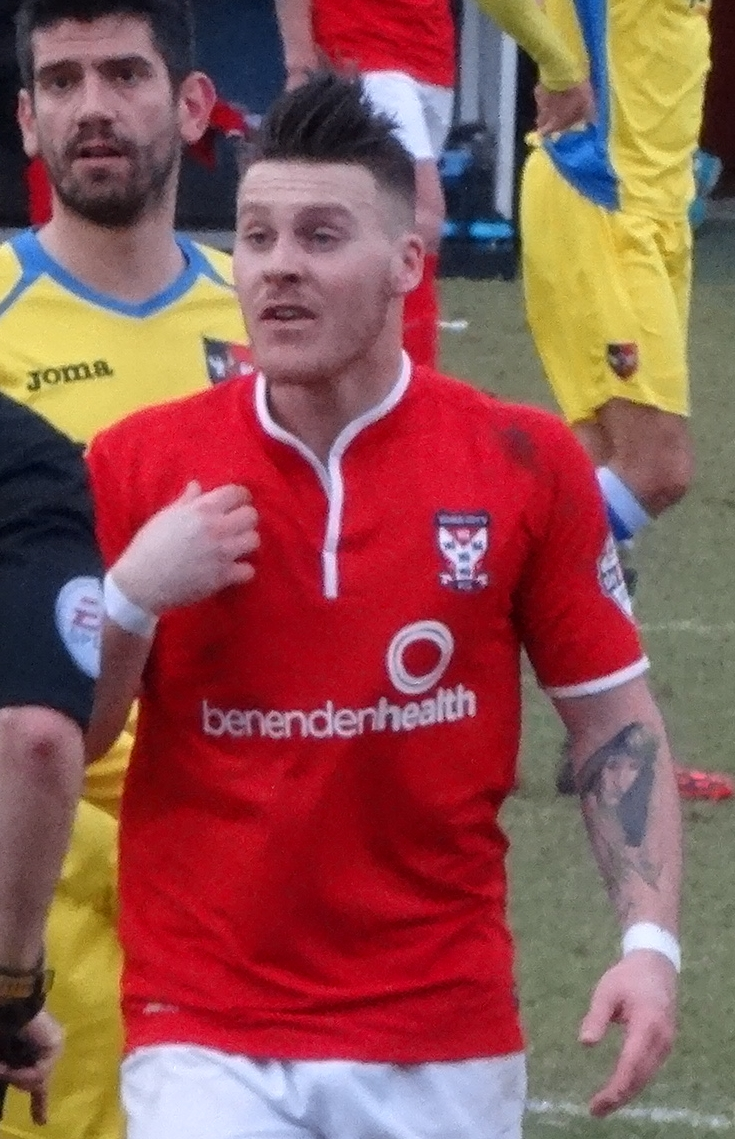
Carson playing for York City in 2015

Carson signed for York City permanently on 12 September 2013 on a contract until the end of the 2013–14 season. His second debut for the club came two days later as a 63rd minute substitute for Sander Puri in a 2–1 home defeat to Mansfield Town. He scored his first goal for York in a 3–0 win away to Torquay United on 5 October 2013. On 13 February 2014, Carson signed a contract extension until the end of the 2014–15 season. He was released by York when his contract expired at the end of 2015–16.

=== Linfield ===
On 3 August 2016, Carson joined NIFL Premiership club Linfield. He made 15 appearances, scoring 2 goals, as Linfield won the 2016–17 NIFL Premiership title.

=== Coleraine ===
On 11 May 2017, Carson signed for Linfield's NIFL Premiership rivals Coleraine on a two-year contract. He was a part of the Coleraine team that won the 2018 Irish Cup.

== International career ==
Carson was capped at under-16, under-17, under-18 and under-19 level for Northern Ireland. He played 13 times for the under-21 team from 2010 to 2013. He made his senior international debut on 24 May 2011 in a 5–0 away defeat to the Republic of Ireland.

== Personal life ==
Born in Ballymena, County Antrim, Carson attended Parkhall College in Antrim, County Antrim.

== Career statistics ==
=== Club ===
As of match played 31 October 2020

Appearances and goals by club, season and competition
Club	Season	League			National Cup (Note: Appearances in FA Cup and Irish Cup)		League Cup		Other		Total	
Club	Season	Division	Apps	Goals	Apps	Goals	Apps	Goals	Apps	Goals	Apps	Goals
Ipswich Town	2010–11	Championship	9	3	0	0	0	0	—		9	3
Ipswich Town	2011–12	Championship	16	2	1	0	0	0	—		17	2
Ipswich Town	2012–13	Championship	6	0	0	0	1	0	—		7	0
Ipswich Town	Total		31	5	1	0	1	0	—		33	5
York City (loan)	2012–13	League Two	5	0	—		—		—		5	0
York City	2013–14	League Two	31	4	1	1	—		0	0	32	5
York City	2014–15	League Two	22	2	1	0	0	0	0	0	23	2
York City	2015–16	League Two	22	1	0	0	2	0	1 (Note: Appearance in Football League Trophy)	0	25	1
York City	Total		80	7	2	1	2	0	1	0	85	8
Linfield	2016–17	NIFL Premiership	13	2	1	0	0	0	1 (Note: Appearance in Scottish Challenge Cup)	0	15	2
Coleraine	2017–18	NIFL Premiership	32	9	3	1	0	0	3 (Note: Two appearances in UEFA Europa League, one appearance and one goal in NIFL Charity Shield)	1	38	11
Coleraine	2018–19	NIFL Premiership	27	2	2	0	1	1	2 (Note: One appearance and one goal in Scottish Challenge Cup, one appearance in UEFA Europa League play-offs)	1	32	4
Coleraine	2019–20	NIFL Premiership	28	3	2	0	4	1	0	0	34	4
Coleraine	2020–21	NIFL Premiership	4	0	0	0	0	0	3 (Note: Appearances in UEFA Europa League)	0	7	0
Coleraine	Total		91	14	7	1	5	2	8	2	111	19
Career total			215	28	11	2	8	2	10	2	244	34

=== International ===
As of match played 15 August 2012

Appearances and goals by national team and year
National team	Year	Apps	Goals
Northern Ireland	2011	2	0
Northern Ireland	2012	2	0
Total		4	0

== Honours ==
Linfield

- NIFL Premiership: 2016–17

Coleraine

- Irish Cup: 2017–18
- Northern Ireland Football League Cup: 2019–20

Individual

- Ipswich Town Young Player of the Year: 2010–11
