= Sir Thomas Chamberlayne, 1st Baronet =

Sir Thomas Chamberlayne
- Died: 1643
- Occupation: Sheriff of Oxfordshire

Sir Thomas Chamberlayne, 1st Baronet (died 1643), of Wickham, Oxfordshire supported the Royalist cause in the English Civil War. He was Sheriff of Oxfordshire in 1643. (Note: Also spelt Thomas Chamberlain and Thomas Chamberlyne)

== Biography ==
Thomas Chamberlayne was the son and heir of Sir Thomas Chamberlayne, one of the Justices of the Court of King's Bench, and his first wife Elizabeth, daughter of Sir George Fermor, of Easton Neston, Northamptonshire. He succeeded his father in September 1625.

He supported the Royalist cause and was created a baronet, on 4 February 1643. He was Sheriff of Oxfordshire in that year. He died (during his Shrievalty and a few months after receiving his Baronetcy) on 6 October 1643. He was succeeded by his son and heir Sir Thomas Chamberlayne, 2nd Baronet.

== Family ==
Chamberlayne married firstly, —, a daughter of — Acland. He married secondly, Anne, daughter of Richard Chamberlatne, of Temple House, county Warwick, and of the Court of Wards.

== Notes ==
Baronetage of England
New creation	Baronet (of Wickham); 1643	Succeeded by Thomas Chamberlayne
