= Sir Thomas Chamberlayne, 2nd Baronet =

Sir Thomas Chamberlayne, (Note: Also spelt Thomas Chamberlain and Thomas Chamberlyne) 2nd Baronet (c. 1635–1682) of Wickham and of Northbrooke, Oxfordshire,was the son of Sir Thomas Chamberlayne, 1st Baronet, and probably inherited the baronetcy on the death of his father on 6 October 1643. The title (one conferred after 4 January 1642) being void under the Act of Parliament (4 February 1652) then in force, (Note: the Act to make void all Titles of Honours, Dignities, or Precedencies, given by the late King since 4 January 1641/2.) on 6 October 1657 he accepted another baronetcy from the Lord Protector Oliver Cromwell, to whose Attorney General, Edmund Prideaux he was son-in-law. This creation became invalid after the Restoration, while his previous one was reinstated. He died late September or early November 1682. The baronetcy passed to James Chamberlayne, 3rd Baronet.

== Family ==
On 8 April 1657, at St. Dionis, Backchurch, London, Chamberlayne married Margaret, daughter of Edmund Prideaux, of Ford Abbey, Devon, by his second wife Margaret, daughter of William Ivert, of Gotthay, Somerset. They had two daughters and coheirs:

- Katharine, who inherited the estate of Wickham, became Viscountess Wenman, and, subsequently Countess of Abingdon.
- Penelope, who inherited the estate of Northbrooke, married Robert Dashwood, who was created a baronet, in 1684, as "baronet of Northbrook".

== Notes ==
Baronetage of England
Preceded by Thomas Chamberlayne	Baronet (of Wickham); 1643–1682	Succeeded by James Chamberlayne
