= Lanre Oyebanjo =

Football player

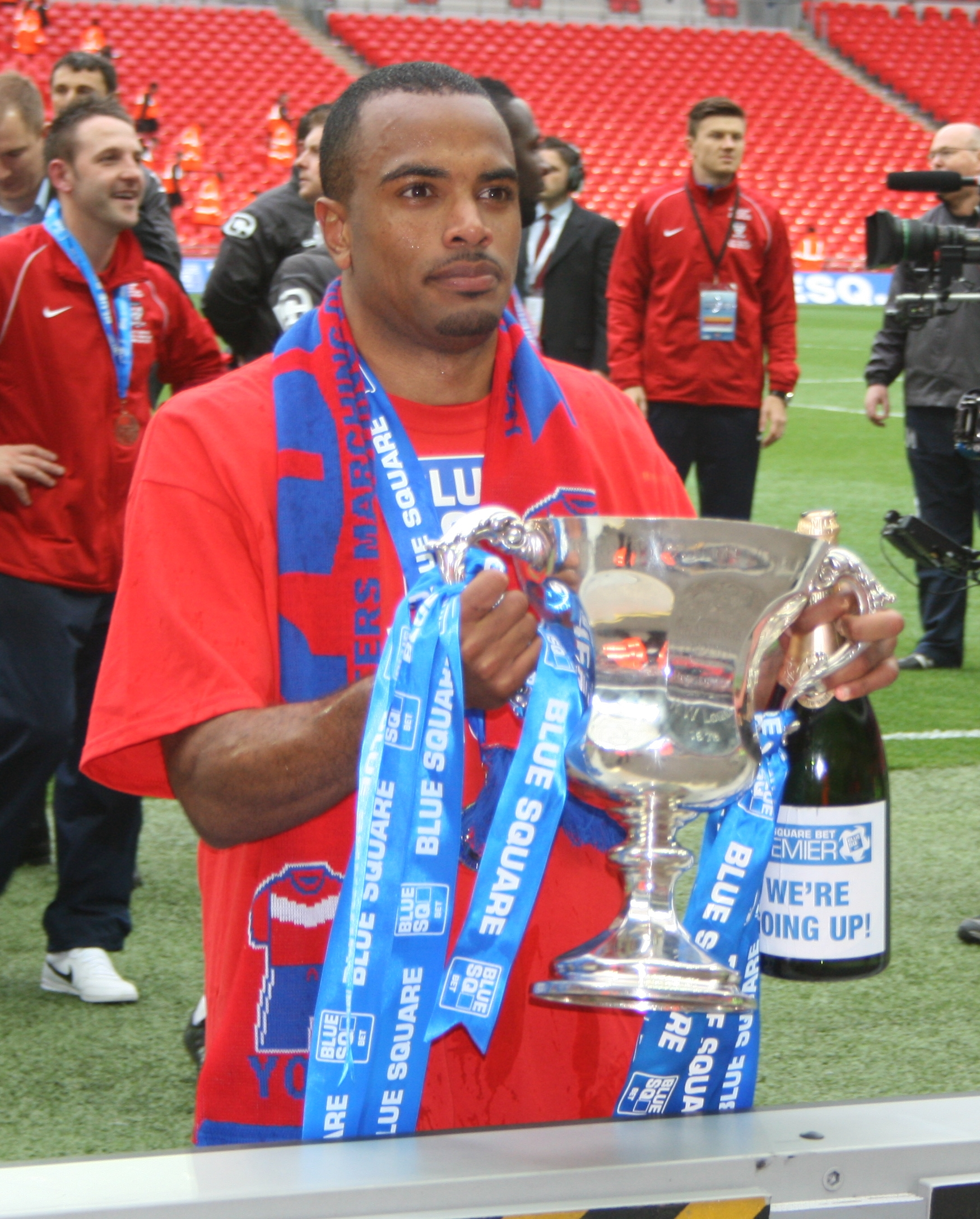
- Oyebanjo after playing for York City in the 2012 Conference Premier play-off final

Personal information
- Full name: Olanrewaju Olusegun Mark Bamidele Oyebanjo
- Date of birth: 27 April 1990 (age 36)
- Place of birth: Hackney, England
- Height: 6 ft 1 in (1.85 m)
- Position: Defender

Team information
- Current team: Welling United

Youth career
- 2000–2006: West Ham United

Senior career*
Years	Team	Apps	(Gls)
2006–2007	Waltham Forest	20	(0)
2007–2008	Brentford	0	(0)
2008–2011	Histon	105	(3)
2011–2014	York City	92	(2)
2014–2016	Crawley Town	38	(0)
2016–2017	York City	4	(0)
2019	Welling United	1	(0)

International career
2008–2009	Republic of Ireland U19	9	(0)
2009–2011	Republic of Ireland U21	6	(0)
- * Club domestic league appearances and goals

Olanrewaju Olusegun Mark Bamidele "Lanre" Oyebanjo (born 27 April 1990) is a professional footballer who last played as a defender for Isthmian League Premier Division club Welling United. He has played in the Football League for York City and Crawley Town.

Oyebanjo started his career with West Ham United's youth system and after being released joined Waltham Forest in 2006. He spent one season with the Isthmian League Division One North club before joining League Two team Brentford in 2007. Having not made any first-team appearances for Brentford, Oyebanjo dropped into the Conference Premier with Histon in 2008. He helped Histon to the play-off semi-final in his first season, but after their relegation to the Conference South in 2011 he remained in the Conference Premier with York City. Oyebanjo scored York's second goal in their 2012 FA Trophy Final victory and then played in the 2012 Conference Premier play-off final, which the team won to earn promotion to League Two. Having been voted York's Clubman of the Year for the 2013–14 season, he signed for League One team Crawley Town in 2014. They were relegated to League Two in 2014–15, and Oyebanjo was released a year later. He returned to York in 2016, who were newly relegated to the National League, before being released a year later.

== Club career ==
=== Early career ===
Oyebanjo was born in Hackney, London to a Nigerian father and an Irish mother. He joined the West Ham United youth system at the age of 10 and while a ball boy for a first-team match in 2004 entered the pitch to retrieve a second ball, while play went on around him. He was released by West Ham aged 16 when he has not offered a scholarship. Oyebanjo started his senior career with Isthmian League Division One North club Waltham Forest in 2006 while studying for his A-levels. Aged 16 he became one of the youngest players in Waltham Forest's history, making his debut in a 2–0 home defeat to Barking in the Essex Senior Cup on 7 November 2006. He made 21 appearances for Waltham Forest in the 2006–07 season before joining Brentford as a member of their youth system. He progressed into Brentford's first-team squad and was an unused substitute in their 2–0 defeat at home to Luton Town on 27 November 2007. However, he finished 2007–08 without making any appearances for Brentford.

=== Histon ===
Following a trial, Oyebanjo signed for Conference Premier club Histon on a short-term contract on 30 July 2008 to provide cover for Craig Pope. He made his debut as a 72nd-minute substitute for Pope in Histon's 1–0 defeat away to Mansfield Town on 12 August 2008, having been on the bench for their opening match of 2008–09. He started the following match, a 1–1 draw away to York City on 16 August 2008, and later that month signed a new two-year contract with Histon. Having established himself as a regular starter, Oyebanjo was named the Conference Premier Player of the Month for October 2008. His first goal for Histon came with a 90th-minute winner in a 1–0 victory at home to Woking on 6 December 2008 with an 18-yard shot. He played in all five of Histon's 2008–09 FA Cup matches, with the club reaching the third round of the competition for the first time in its history, when the team were beaten 2–1 at home to Championship team Swansea City on 13 January 2009. Oyebanjo played in both of Histon's play-off matches against Torquay United in May 2009, which the team lost 2–1 on aggregate. His first season with Histon saw him make 49 appearances and score one goal.

Oyebanjo started the 2009–10 opener, a 3–0 victory away to Gateshead on 8 August 2009, and remained in the team before picking up a knee injury during a 2–0 home win over Salisbury City on 22 August. His absence was extended after undergoing surgery on his knee in September 2009, with his return to the team coming after starting Histon's 5–2 home win over Forest Green Rovers on 17 October. Oyebanjo went on a one-week trial with Championship outfit Peterborough United in October 2009 and this included playing in a friendly against Histon. Histon chairman Tony Roach later commented that he believed the player would leave the club in the January 2010 transfer window for a Football League club. He eventually stayed with Histon, although his loss of form since his Peterborough trial was attributed by manager Alan Lewer to Oyebanjo's agent, claiming he was unsettling the player. A hamstring injury sustained during a 1–0 win away to Ebbsfleet United on 9 February 2010 kept him out of the team for over two weeks before returning as a 65th-minute substitute in a 3–0 defeat to Kidderminster Harriers on 27 February. Oyebanjo finished the season with 29 appearances and one goal.

He was out of contract with Histon in the summer of 2010, but, following a spell training with League Two team Wycombe Wanderers, stayed on with the club having decided to start a university course in the autumn. Oyebanjo started the 2011–12 opener, a 3–1 home win against Barrow, before scoring his first goal of the season with an 87th-minute equaliser from a 25-yard free kick in a 1–1 draw at home with Eastbourne Borough, which was David Livermore's first match as manager. A hamstring injury kept him out of the team for over four weeks before making his return in a 1–1 draw away to Fleetwood Town on 2 October 2010. He assisted Murray's equalising goal in the 67th minute with a cross, and Livermore praised his performance by saying his return helped improve the team. A calf injury sustained in training kept him out of a match against Luton and his return came in a 2–1 home defeat to Bath City on 25 November 2010. After finishing the season with 40 appearances and two goals he was offered a new contract by the club in May 2011. Despite their relegation to the Conference South he considered staying with the club, being quoted as saying: "I've just got to weigh up my options as I'm not too sure what I want to do at the current time".

=== York City ===
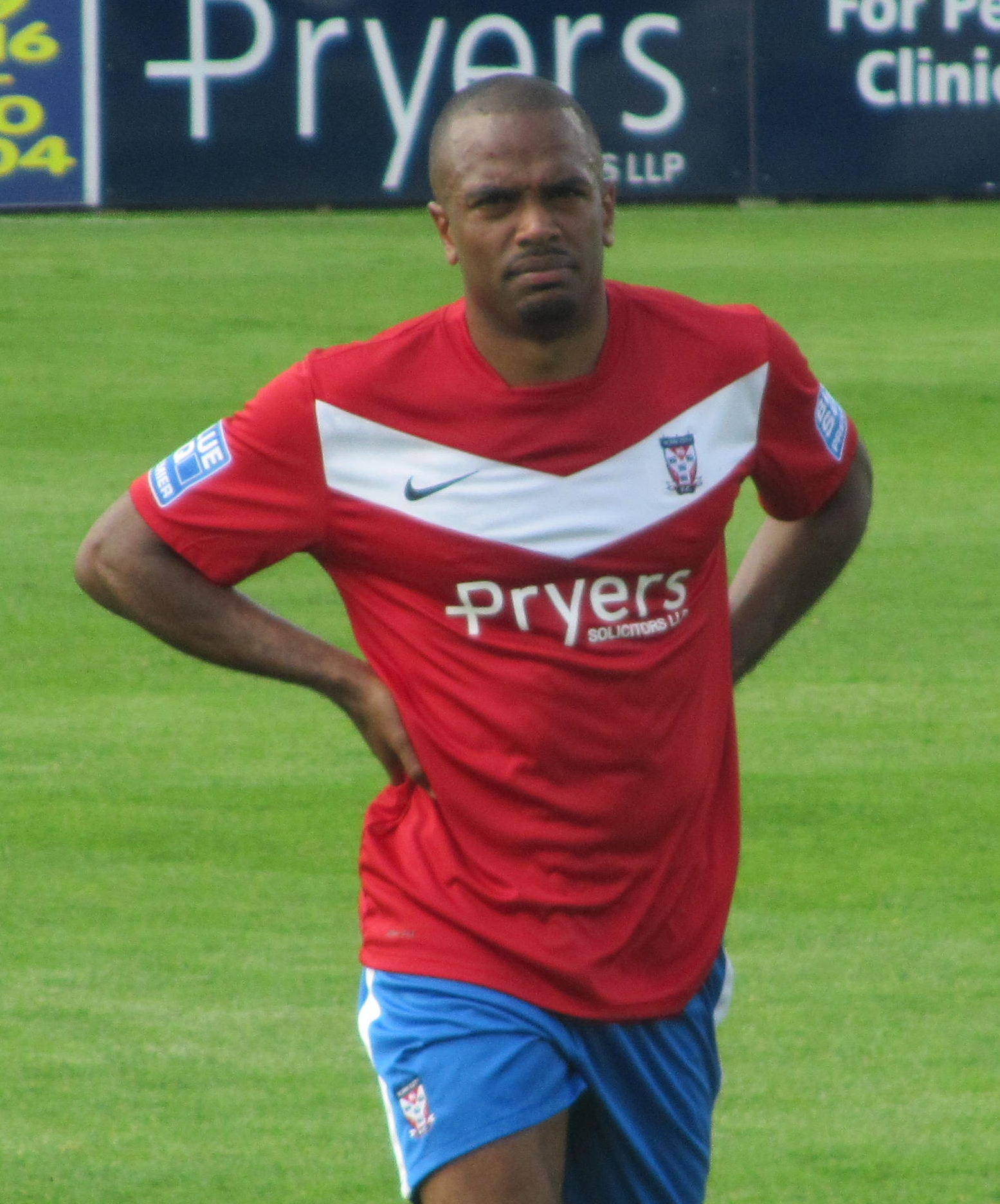
Oyebanjo playing for York City in 2011

After rejecting Histon's contract offer, Oyebanjo signed for Conference Premier club York City on a two-year contract for a compensation fee on 25 June 2011. He made his debut in a 2–1 victory away to Ebbsfleet on the opening day of 2011–12 on 13 August 2011 and assisted York's winner with a cross which was converted by Jason Walker in the 90th minute. He picked up a hamstring injury in York's 2–1 away defeat to Tamworth on 10 September 2011, and returned to the starting line-up for a 2–1 FA Cup fourth qualifying round defeat away to Wrexham on 29 October. He did not appear again until York's 1–1 away draw with Forest Green on 26 November 2011 and having regained his place in the team was dropped for a match against Lincoln City on 7 January 2012. Oyebanjo returned in York's 1–0 away victory against Grimsby Town in the FA Trophy quarter-final on 25 February 2012 and scored his first goal for the club with the opening goal of a 2–0 victory at home to Hayes & Yeading United on 3 March. An ankle injury in the 1–0 victory at home to Luton in the FA Trophy semi-final first leg on 10 March 2012, in which he was played in central midfield, kept him out of the team before returning in York's 2–1 home defeat to Southport on 24 March.

Oyebanjo returned from a hamstring injury sustained during York's 1–0 win at Cambridge United on 17 April 2012 in the team's play-off semi-final second leg 1–0 extra-time win away to Mansfield on 7 May, which saw them progress to the final 2–1 on aggregate. He scored the second goal in the 2012 FA Trophy Final at Wembley Stadium with a close range finish from Ashley Chambers' cross; York went on to win the match 2–0, against Newport County. Oyebanjo started the 2012 Conference Premier play-off final against Luton at Wembley in central midfield, but was moved to right back after an injury to Jon Challinor, and during the second half performed two far-post interceptions to deny Craig McAllister and John Paul Kissock from scoring. York won the match 2–1 to win promotion to League Two and thus return to the Football League after an eight-year absence. His first season at York concluded with 27 appearances and three goals.

Oyebanjo made his first appearance of 2012–13 in York's 2–2 draw away to Morecambe on 21 August 2012. He finished the season with 32 appearances before signing a new one-year contract at York in May 2013. Having made 46 appearances in 2013–14 as York reached the play-off semi-final, Oyebanjo was voted Clubman of the Year by the club's supporters

=== Later career ===
Oyebanjo turned down a new contract with York to sign a two-year contract with Crawley Town of League One on 4 June 2014. He made 36 appearances as Crawley were relegated after finishing 22nd in League One. At the end of 2015–16, Crawley decided against extending Oyebanjo's contract after only appearing seven times, so therefore he was released.

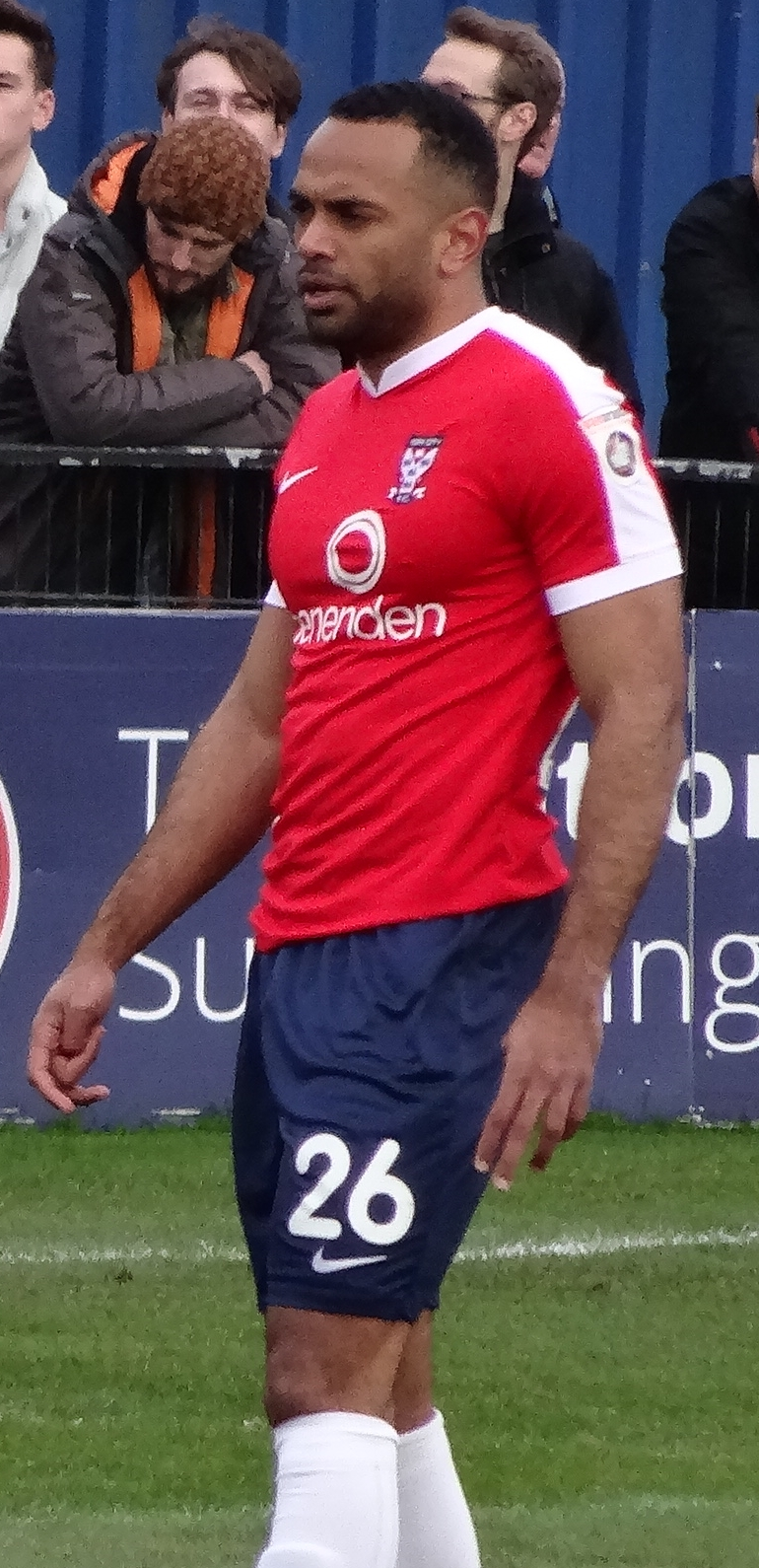
Oyebanjo playing for York City in 2017

On 22 July 2016, Oyebanjo re-signed for York City, who were newly relegated to the National League, on a one-year contract with the option of a further year. He was released at the end of 2016–17.

Oyebanjo signed for National League South club Welling United in February 2019 after spending 18 months recovering from injury. He made his debut on 2 March as an 11th-minute substitute in a 2–2 draw at home to St Albans City in the league.

== International career ==
Oyebanjo represented the Republic of Ireland at under-19 level, making his debut in a 1–0 defeat to Portugal in the Under-19 Midlands International Tournament on 18 August 2008. He appeared in their two remaining matches at the tournament, a 1–0 defeat to Ukraine on 19 August 2008 and a 2–0 loss to Spain on 21 August. He appeared in three 2009 UEFA European Under-19 Championship qualification matches in November 2008, including victories over Malta and Liechtenstein and a defeat to France. Oyebanjo featured in their three 2009 UEFA European Under-19 Championship elite qualification matches in June 2009. The matches against Belgium and Switzerland resulted in defeat, but when Oyebanjo captained the Republic of Ireland against Sweden, the team recorded a 2–1 victory. He finished his under-19 career with nine caps and in August 2010 was named the FAI Under-19 International Player of the Year.

He made his under-21 debut as an 84th-minute substitute in a 1–1 draw away to Georgia on 14 November 2009 in a 2011 UEFA European Under-21 Championship qualification Group 2 match. Three days later, he started the Republic of Ireland's 1–1 away draw against Armenia in the same competition. Having been an unused substitute against Armenia on 3 March 2010, he entered a 5–0 home qualification win over Estonia on 10 August as an 87th-minute substitute. Oyebanjo was on the bench for the Republic of Ireland's opening 2013 UEFA European Under-21 Championship qualification Group 7 match against Hungary on 1 September 2011 before starting their 1–0 defeat away to Turkey on 6 September. He was capped six times by the Republic of Ireland at under-21 level.

== Style of play ==
Oyebanjo primarily plays at right back but is capable of playing at centre back.

== Personal life ==
Oyebanjo graduated from City, University of London with a BSc in Mathematics & Finance. As of 2017, he was working as a financial planner.

== Career statistics ==
As of match played 2 March 2019

Appearances and goals by club, season and competition
Club	Season	League			FA Cup		League Cup		Other		Total	
Club	Season	Division	Apps	Goals	Apps	Goals	Apps	Goals	Apps	Goals	Apps	Goals
Waltham Forest	2006–07	Isthmian League Division One North	20	0	0	0	—		1 (Note: Appearance in Essex Senior Cup)	0	21	0
Brentford	2007–08	League Two	0	0	0	0	0	0	0	0	0	0
Histon	2008–09	Conference Premier	40	1	5	0	—		4 (Note: One appearance in Conference League Cup, one in FA Trophy, two in Conference Premier play-offs)	0	49	1
Histon	2009–10	Conference Premier	27	0	1	1	—		1 (Note: Appearance in FA Trophy)	0	29	1
Histon	2010–11	Conference Premier	38	2	1	0	—		1	0	40	2
Histon	Total		105	3	7	1	—		6	0	118	4
York City	2011–12	Conference Premier	21	2	1	0	—		5 (Note: Three appearances and one goal in FA Trophy, two appearances in Conference Premier play-offs)	1	27	3
York City	2012–13	League Two	30	0	1	0	0	0	1 (Note: Appearance(s) in Football League Trophy)	0	32	0
York City	2013–14	League Two	41	0	2	0	1	0	2 (Note: Appearances in League Two play-offs)	0	46	0
York City	Total		92	2	4	0	1	0	8	1	105	3
Crawley Town	2014–15	League One	31	0	1	0	2	0	2	0	36	0
Crawley Town	2015–16	League Two	7	0	0	0	0	0	0	0	7	0
Crawley Town	Total		38	0	1	0	2	0	2	0	43	0
York City	2016–17	National League	4	0	2	0	—		1	0	7	0
Welling United	2018–19	National League South	1	0	—		—		—		1	0
Career total			260	5	14	1	3	0	18	1	295	7

== Honours ==
York City

- FA Trophy: 2011–12
- Conference Premier play-offs: 2012

Individual

- York City Clubman of the Year: 2013–14
