= Jamal Fyfield =

English footballer (born 1989)

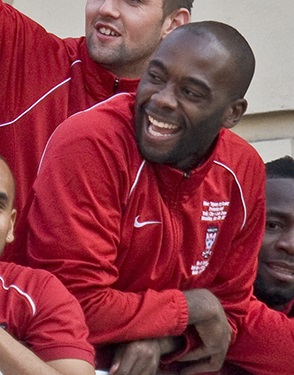
- Fyfield with the victory parade that followed York City's victory in the 2012 Conference Premier play-off final

Personal information
- Full name: Jamal Nehemiah Fyfield
- Date of birth: 17 March 1989 (age 37)
- Place of birth: Leyton, England
- Height: 6 ft 1 in (1.85 m)
- Position: Centre back

Team information
- Current team: St Albans City

Youth career
- –2007: Leyton Orient

Senior career*
Years	Team	Apps	(Gls)
2007–2010	Maidenhead United	90	(2)
2007	→ Potters Bar Town (loan)	5	(0)
2010–2014	York City	79	(4)
2011	→ Maidenhead United (loan)	6	(0)
2014	Grimsby Town	9	(0)
2014–2015	Welling United	34	(1)
2015–2016	Wrexham	43	(0)
2016–2018	Gateshead	71	(3)
2018–2024	Boreham Wood	196	(14)
2024–2025	Braintree Town	24	(0)
2025–	St Albans City	0	(0)
- * Club domestic league appearances and goals as of 18:28, 29 June 2025 (UTC)

Jamal Nehemiah Fyfield (born 17 March 1989) is an English professional footballer who plays as a centre back for Isthmian League Premier Division club St Albans City. He has played in the Football League for York City.

Fyfield started his career with Leyton Orient's youth system but was released after serving his scholarship. He joined Maidenhead United of the Conference South in 2007 and was named the club's Young Player of the Year in 2009. He signed for Conference Premier club York City in 2010 before going back on loan to Maidenhead for one month. He played in the York team that won promotion to League Two in the 2011–12 season, although he did not feature in the 2012 Conference Premier play-off final. After a year and a half of playing for York in League Two, Fyfield joined Grimsby Town in 2014. Fyfield joined Welling United later that year, spending one season at the club before joining Wrexham in 2015. He left after 2015–16 to join Gateshead.

== Career ==
=== Early career ===
Fyfield was born in Leyton, Greater London. He started his career in the youth system of hometown club Leyton Orient and signed a two-year scholarship with the club in 2005. Fyfield was released at the end of his scholarship and signed for newly promoted Conference South club Maidenhead United in the summer of 2007. He made his debut as a substitute in Maidenhead's 3–3 draw at home to Havant & Waterlooville on 15 September 2007. Fyfield's first start came on 22 September in a 1–1 draw away to Hampton & Richmond Borough. He had a spell on loan with Potters Bar Town of the Isthmian League Division One North later in 2007, for whom he made five league appearances. He finished the 2007–08 season, his first at Maidenhead, with 18 appearances.

Fyfield's first appearance of 2008–09 came as a substitute in Maidenhead's 4–2 victory away to Bognor Regis Town on 23 August 2008. From 1 January 2009, he started all but three of Maidenhead's remaining matches of the season, going on to finish the campaign with 33 appearances. He was given the club's Young Player of the Year award. Fyfield started Maidenhead's opening match of the 2009–10 season, a 0–0 draw at home to Dover Athletic on 8 August 2009. He scored the first goal of his senior career on 10 April 2010 with the winning goal away to Bishop's Stortford in the 54th minute. He finished the season with 39 appearances and two goals, after which he signed a new contract with the club in July 2010, despite seeking a transfer to a full-time club.

=== York City ===
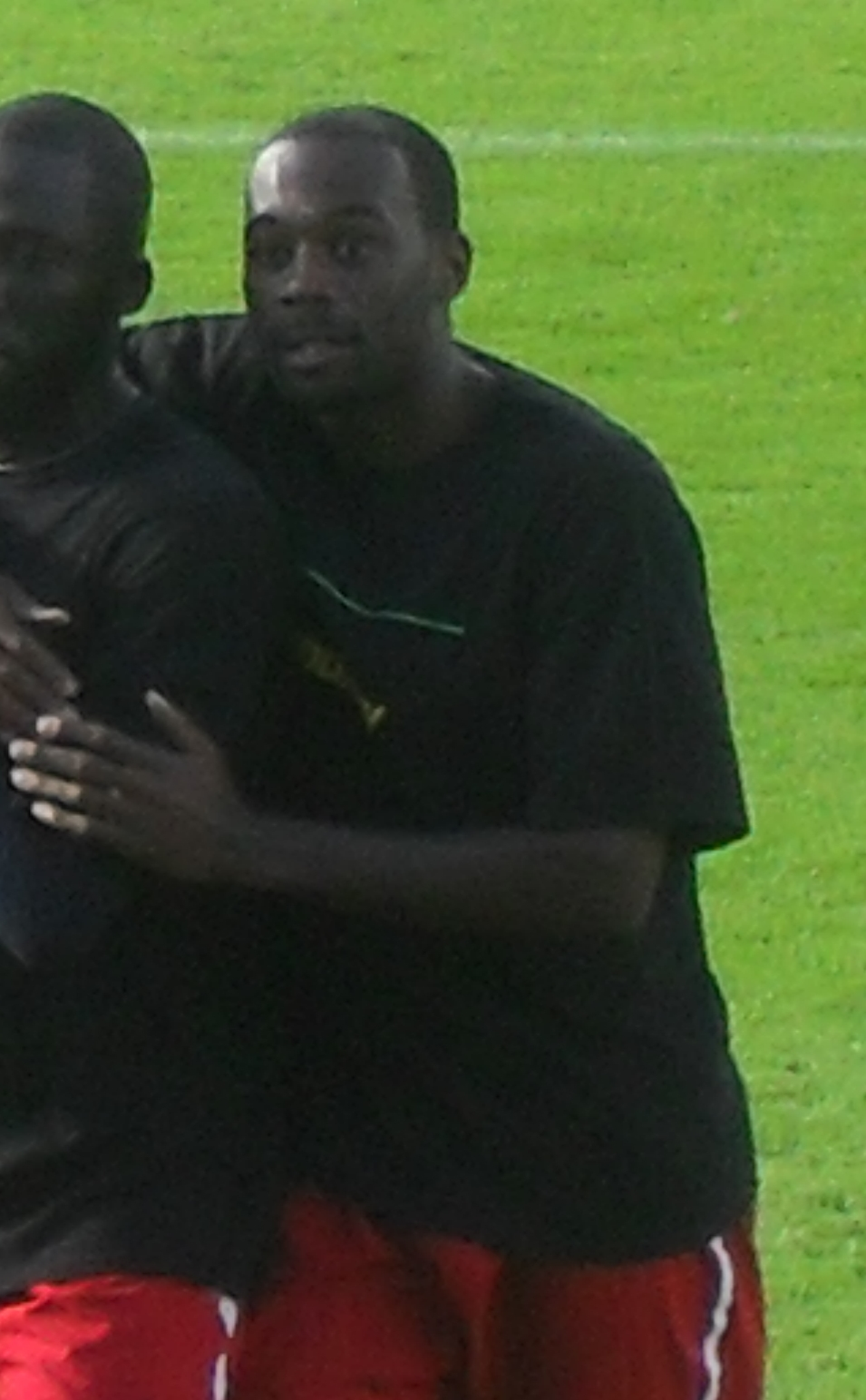
Fyfield warming up for York City in 2010

Fyfield had played six matches for Maidenhead in the 2010–11 season when he signed for Conference Premier club York City on 18 September 2010 on a contract until the end of the season for a nominal fee after a trial. He scored on his York debut with the final goal of a 3–1 victory away to Tamworth on 25 September. Having lost his place in the team with 11 appearances to his name, Fyfield returned to Maidenhead on 31 January 2011 on a one-month loan. His first match since returning came in a 2–2 draw at home to Bishop's Stortford on 5 February, and he went on to make six appearances before deciding to cut the loan spell short to fight for a place in the team at York. Fyfield returned to the York team after starting their last three matches of the 2010–11 season. Having finished the season with 14 appearances for York, he signed a new one-year contract with the club in May 2011.

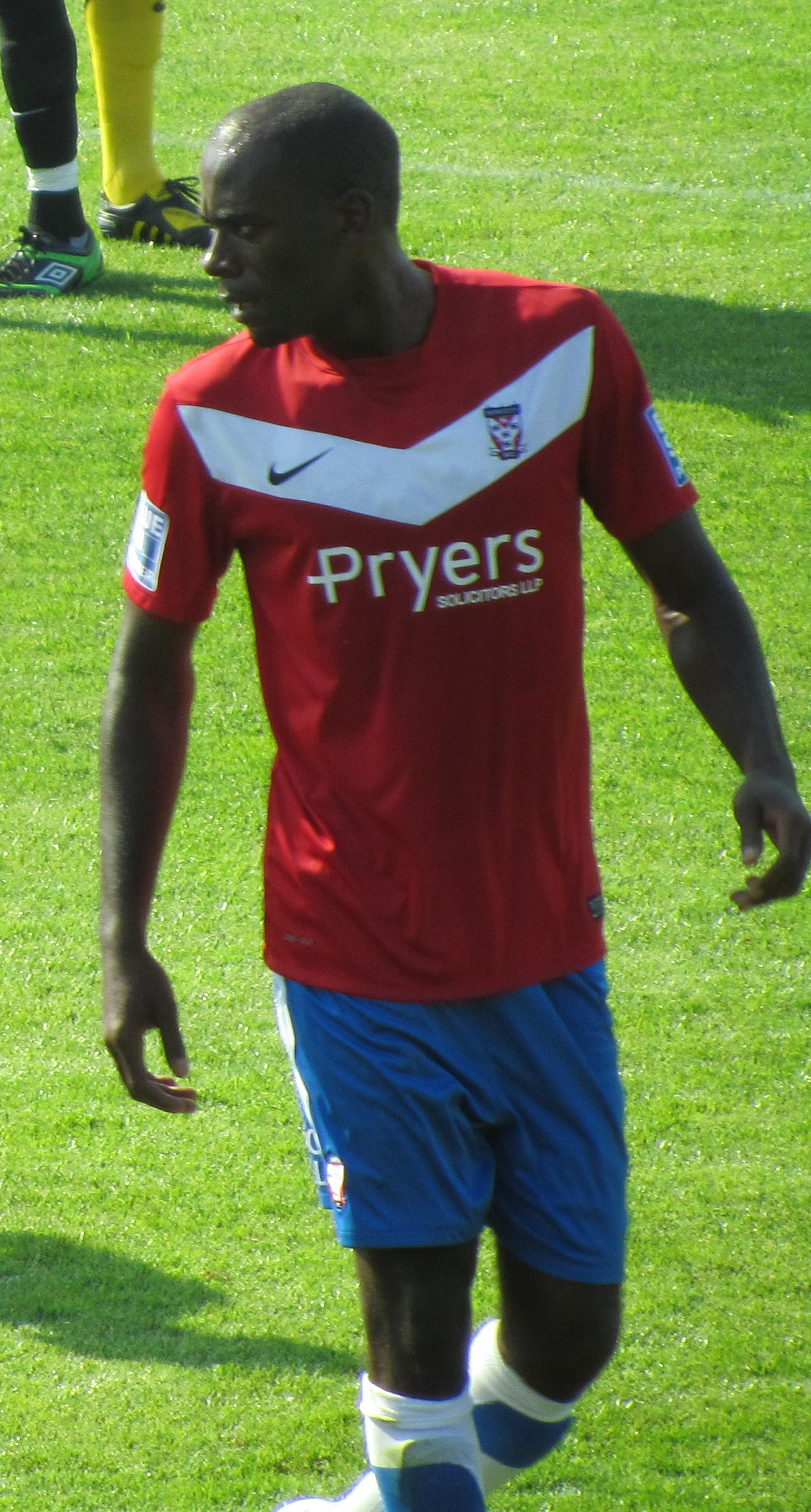
Fyfield playing for York City in 2011

Fyfield made his first appearance of the 2011–12 season as a 64th-minute substitute in York's 1–0 defeat at home to AFC Telford United on 20 August 2011. He continued to be used as a substitute until starting a 1–0 victory at home to Bath City on 13 September. Having established himself in central defence alongside David McGurk, Fyfield scored his first goal of the season with a backheel in York's 6–2 home win over Braintree Town on 8 October 2011. He lost his place in the starting line-up following York's 1–1 draw at home to Mansfield Town on 26 December 2011 and did not return until a 0–0 home draw against Tamworth on 6 March 2012 due to other players being unavailable. Two matches later he scored a stoppage time winner in a 3–2 victory away to Grimsby Town on 13 March 2012 with a forward run and shot into the bottom-left corner from outside the penalty area, after being at fault for Grimsby's first goal. Four days later, Fyfield assisted Matty Blair's winning goal in the FA Trophy semi-final second leg away to Luton Town with a cross from the left flank, with the final score of 1–1 seeing York progress to the final 2–1 on aggregate.

Having started York's 1–1 draw at home to Mansfield in the first leg of the play-off semi-final on 2 May 2012, Fyfield was named on the bench for the second leg five days later. He entered the match as an 87th-minute substitute, and during extra time passed to Jason Walker on the left, who went on to assist Blair's winning goal, seeing York progress to the play-off final. Fyfield entered the 2012 FA Trophy Final on 12 May as an 83rd-minute substitute, in which York beat Newport County 2–0 at Wembley Stadium. He was not named in the squad for the 2012 Conference Premier play-off final on 20 May, which York won with a 2–1 victory over Luton at Wembley Stadium to earn promotion to League Two after an eight-year absence from the Football League. Having finished the season with 40 appearances and three goals, he signed a new one-year contract at York in June 2012, with the option of a further year.

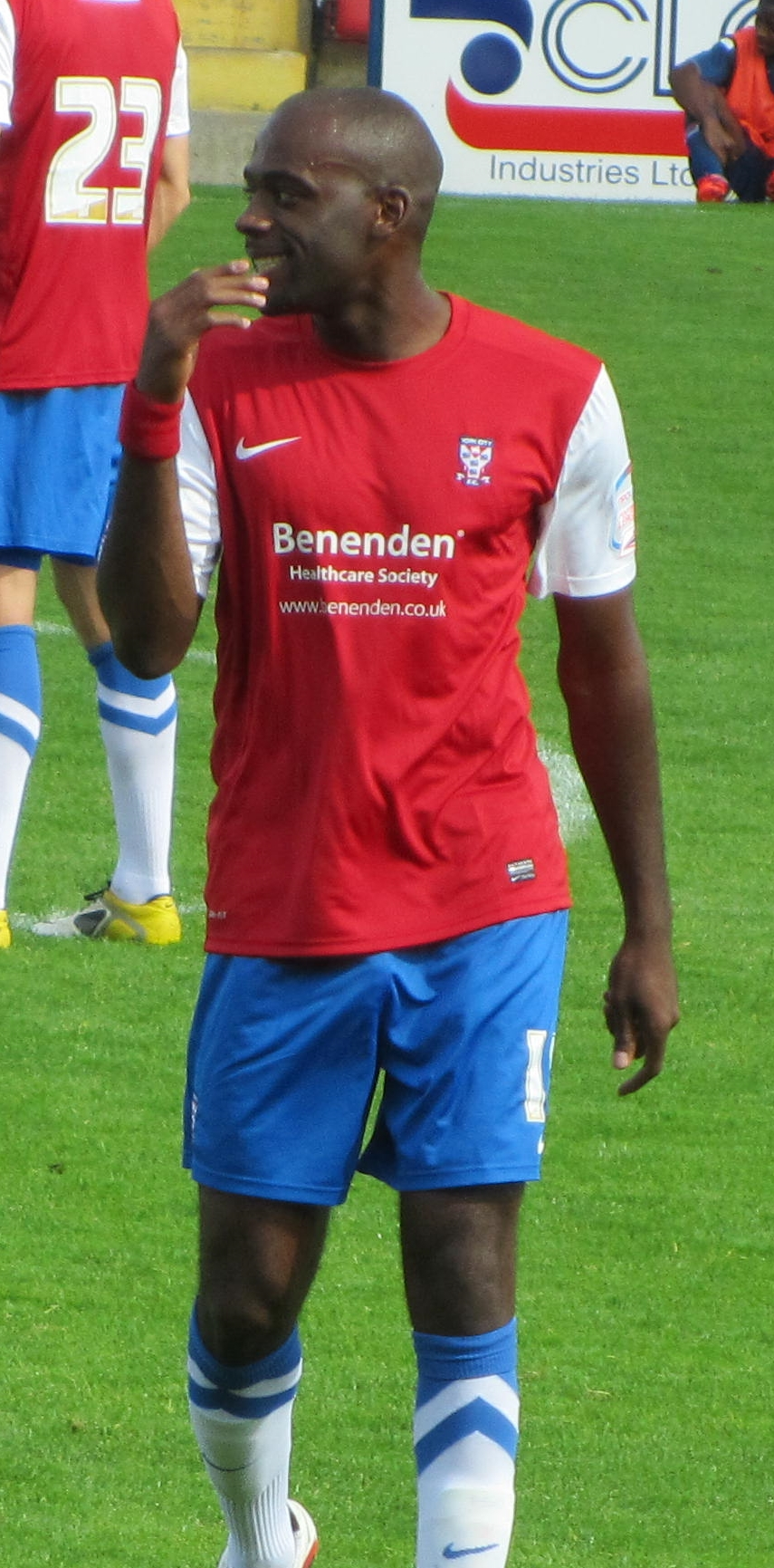
Fyfield playing for York City in 2012

Fyfield started York's match away to League One team Doncaster Rovers in the League Cup first round in the opening match of the 2012–13 season on 11 August 2012, which the team lost 4–2 in a penalty shoot-out following a 1–1 draw after extra time. He then played in York's first Football League fixture since their promotion, a 3–1 defeat at home to Wycombe Wanderers on 18 August. After making five appearances in 2013–14, Fyfield left York by mutual consent on 13 January 2014, along with Craig Clay.

=== Grimsby Town ===
On the same day as his departure from York, Fyfield signed for Conference Premier club Grimsby Town on a contract until the end of the 2013–14 season. Fyfield was released on 9 May 2014 having made 13 appearances for Grimsby.

=== Welling United ===
He signed for another Conference Premier club, Welling United, on 24 June 2014. He made his debut in a 1–1 home draw with Telford on the opening day of the 2014–15 season on 9 August 2014.

=== Wrexham ===
Fyfield joined Welling's National League rivals Wrexham on 8 June 2015 on a one-year contract, having previously played under their manager Gary Mills at York.

=== Gateshead ===
Fyfield rejected a new contract with Wrexham to sign a two-year contract with their National League rivals Gateshead on 19 May 2016.

=== Boreham Wood ===
Fyfield signed for Gateshead's National League rivals Boreham Wood on 15 June 2018 on a contract of undisclosed length.

Following relegation to the National League South, Fyfield was released at the end of the 2023–24 season.

=== Braintree Town ===
In June 2024, Fyfield joined newly promoted National League side Braintree Town.

On 29 June 2025, Fyfield's departure was confirmed by the club.

=== St Albans City ===
On 5 July 2025, Fyfield joined Isthmian League Premier Division side St Albans City.

== Style of play ==
Fyfield primarily plays centre back, but can also play at left back and has provided cover as a left winger.

== Other ventures ==
Fyfield and Femi Ilesanmi run a podcast called "Beyond The 92", where they talk about the National League.

He is a graduate of Staffordshire University where he completed a degree in Professional Sports Writing and Broadcasting.

== Career statistics ==
As of end of 2024–25 season

Appearances and goals by club, season and competition
Club	Season	League			FA Cup		League Cup		Other		Total	
Club	Season	Division	Apps	Goals	Apps	Goals	Apps	Goals	Apps	Goals	Apps	Goals
Maidenhead United	2007–08	Conference South	16	0	0	0	—		2 (Note: Appearance(s) in Conference League Cup)	0	18	0
Maidenhead United	2008–09	Conference South	31	0	1	0	—		1	0	33	0
Maidenhead United	2009–10	Conference South	37	2	1	0	—		1 (Note: Appearance(s) in FA Trophy)	0	39	2
Maidenhead United	2010–11	Conference South	6	0	—		—		—		6	0
Maidenhead United	Total		90	2	2	0	—		4	0	96	2
Potters Bar Town (loan)	2007–08	Isthmian League Division; One North	5	0	—		—		—		5	0
York City	2010–11	Conference Premier	11	1	3	0	—		0	0	14	1
York City	2011–12	Conference Premier	33	3	0	0	—		7 (Note: Five appearances in FA Trophy, two in Conference Premier play-offs)	0	40	3
York City	2012–13	League Two	33	0	2	0	1	0	1 (Note: Appearance in Football League Trophy)	0	37	0
York City	2013–14	League Two	2	0	2	0	1	0	0	0	5	0
York City	Total		79	4	7	0	2	0	8	0	96	4
Maidenhead United (loan)	2010–11	Conference South	6	0	—		—		—		6	0
Grimsby Town	2013–14	Conference Premier	9	0	—		—		4 (Note: Three appearances in FA Trophy, one in Conference Premier play-offs)	0	13	0
Welling United	2014–15	Conference Premier	34	1	1	0	—		2	0	37	1
Wrexham	2015–16	National League	43	0	1	0	—		2	0	46	0
Gateshead	2016–17	National League	37	2	2	0	—		2	0	41	2
Gateshead	2017–18	National League	34	1	1	0	—		7	0	42	1
Gateshead	Total		71	3	3	0	—		9	0	83	3
Boreham Wood	2018–19	National League	43	3	3	1	—		3 (Note: One appearance in Scottish Challenge Cup, two in FA Trophy)	0	49	4
Boreham Wood	2019–20	National League	25	2	1	0	—		3 (Note: One appearance in FA Trophy, two in National League play-offs)	0	29	2
Boreham Wood	2020–21	National League	42	2	4	2	—		1	0	47	4
Boreham Wood	2021–22	National League	34	4	4	0	—		2	0	40	4
Boreham Wood	2022–23	National League	27	2	2	0	—		1	0	30	2
Boreham Wood	2023–24	National League	25	1	2	0	—		0	0	27	1
Boreham Wood	Total		196	14	16	3	—		10	0	222	17
Braintree Town	2024–25	National League	24	0	2	0	—		0	0	26	0
Career total			557	24	32	3	2	0	39	0	630	27

== Honours ==
York City

- FA Trophy: 2011–12
