= 2010 Welsh Cup final =

2010 Football Association of Wales Challenge Cup final
- Event: 2009–10 Welsh Cup
Port Talbot Town	Bangor City
2	3
- Date: 1 May 2010
- Venue: Parc y Scarlets, Llanelli
- Man of the Match: Lee Hunt
- Referee: Dean John (Wales)
- Attendance: 1,303

The 2010 Welsh Cup final was the final of the 124th season of the main domestic football cup competition in Wales, the Welsh Cup. The final was played at Parc y Scarlets in Llanelli on 1 May 2010 and marked the second time the final has been staged at the stadium. The match was contested by Port Talbot Town, who beat Bala Town 1–0 in their semi-final, and Bangor City who beat Prestatyn Town 2–0 in their semi-final.

Welsh Premier League side Port Talbot Town were contesting a Welsh Cup final for the first time in their history. While it is Bangor City's 14th appearance in the final, who were looking to make history as the first North Wales club to win three consecutive Welsh Cups in 100 years.

== Background ==
Port Talbot Town began the match having just finished 3rd in the Welsh Premier League to gain a spot in the 2010–11 UEFA Europa League First qualifying round and Bangor City finished 5th, narrowly missed out on the European spot, both had finished the league two points apart. The two teams had met each other twice that season with one game won by Port Talbot Town 2–1 and the other ending one all.

Bangor City went into the match as 7-time winners of the competition, they were the defending champions having won in 2009 and where looking to make a hat-trick of victories having also won the cup in 2008. Port Talbot Town appear in their first Welsh Cup final.

== Route to the final ==
=== Bangor City ===
Round	Opposition	Score	Venue
Second Round	Elements Cefn Druids	4–1	Farrar Road (h)
Third Round	Flint Town United	0–1	Cae-y-Castell (a)
Fourth Round	Aberaman Athletic	3–1	Farrar Road (h)
Quarter-final	Llanelli AFC	2–0	Farrar Road (h)
Semi-final	Prestatyn Town	2–0	Latham Park (n)

Bangor City started their defence of the Welsh Cup at home to fellow Welsh Premier League side Elements Cefn Druids. Elements Cefn Druids took the lead through a 19th-minute goal provided by John Rush, son of former Welsh International Ian Rush. The visitors took the lead to half time, leaving Bangor City only 45 minutes away from losing their first game in the Welsh Cup since October 2006. The Citizens took to the field seven minutes early ready for second half and attacked from the off, Bangor found their feet early when Chris Sharp found the net, only for it to be disallowed for offside, but it was not until the 61st minute that they equalised when Jamie Reed headed one in from Marc Limbert cross. Bangor took the lead 16 minutes later when James Brewerton accepted a throw-in to slot one home. On the 81st minute the Citizens sealed their Third round spot with a header from Chris Sharp, only for Reed to get another three minutes before time.

At the end of October Bangor travelled to Cae-y-Castell, home of Cymru Alliance outfit Flint Town United.

On 30 January, Farrar Road would welcome Welsh Football League Division One club Aberaman Athletic. Despite dominating the play for most of the first half it was the visitors who would take the lead, when after 18 minutes John Phillips got the ball past Paul Smith. City rallied and came through 3–1 thanks to goals from Jamie Reed, Craig Garside and a 93rd-minute penalty from Reed.

In the last eight, played on 27 February, Bangor hosted Llanelli. An early Jamie Reed penalty settled nerves before David Morley settled things with a 90th minute piledriver.

City brushed aside Prestatyn town in the semi-final at Latham Park, Newtown. Mark Smyth and Craig Garside did the business for the Blues, who were denied further goals by the outstanding form of rotund Prestatyn goalkeeper, John-Hill Dunt.

=== Port Talbot Town ===
Round	Opposition	Score	Venue
Second Round	Cwmbran Celtic	5–0	Victoria Road (h)
Third Round	Caldicot Town	0–3	Jubilee Way (a)
Fourth Round	Aberystwyth Town	0–2	Park Avenue (a)
Quarter-final	The New Saints	2–2^{a.e.t.} 3–4^{pen.}	Park Hall (a)
Semi-final	Bala Town	0–1	Park Avenue (n)

== Pre-match ==
=== Officials ===
Swansea-based referee Dean John was named as the referee for the 2010 Welsh Cup Final on 15 April 2010. John had previously acted as the Fourth official in the 2007 Welsh Cup Final and as referee in 2005 FAW Youth Cup Final.

His assistants for the 2010 final were Hywel James, of Cardiff, Martin William of Wrexham, with Mike Jones also of Wrexham as the fourth official.

== Match ==
=== Details ===
1 May 2010
16:30 BST

Port Talbot Town	2–3	Bangor City
Fahiya 57'; McCreesh 85'	Report	Hunt 6'; Reed 16'; Morley 90+2'

Parc y Scarlets, Llanelli
Attendance: 1,303
Referee: Dean John (Swansea)

Port Talbot Town	Bangor City

PORT TALBOT TOWN:
GK	1	(Wales) Lee Kendall
RB	17	(Wales) Leigh De-Vulgt	(yellow card) 60'	(substituted off) 63'
CB	33	(Wales) Scott Barrow
CB	26	(Wales) Matthew Rees (c)
LB	3	(Wales) Lee Surman
DM	12	(Wales) Gareth Phillips	(yellow card) 39'
CM	5	(Wales) Lloyd Grist
CM	8	(Wales) Liam McCreesh
RW	39	(England) Martin Rose
LW	15	(Wales) Drew Fahiya		(substituted off) 66'
CF	11	(Wales) Daniel Thomas		(substituted off) 66'
Substitutes:
MF	12	(Wales) Nicky Holland		(substituted on) 63'
MF	14	(Wales) Lee John		(substituted on) 66'
MF	16	(Wales) Karl Lewis		(substituted on) 66'
MF		(England) Matthew Thopson
DF		(England) Gary Bansor
Manager:
(Wales) Mark Jones

BANGOR CITY:
GK	1	(England) Paul Smith
DF	2	(England) Peter Hoy
DF	3	(Wales) Chris Roberts
DF	4	(England) Dave Morley	(yellow card) 90'
DF	5	(Wales) James Brewerton (c)
MF	6	(Wales) Craig Garside
FW	7	(Wales) Jamie Reed		(substituted off) 90+2'
MF	11	(England) Mark Smyth	(yellow card) 36'	(substituted off) 69'
FW	16	(England) Eddie Jebb		(substituted off) 80'
S	17	(England) Lee Hunt
DF	8	(England) Michael Johnston	(yellow card) 32'
Substitutes:
MF	12	(Wales) Sion Edwards		(substituted on) 69'
MF	15	(Wales) Marc Limbert		(substituted on) 80'
MF	9	(Wales) Les Davies		(substituted on) 90+2'
MF		(England) Matty Hurdman
DF		(Wales) Clive Williams
Manager:
(Wales) Neville Powell

MATCH OFFICIALS

- Assistant referees:
  - Hywyl James (Cardiff)
  - Martin Williams (Wrexham)
- Fourth official: Mike Jones (Wrexham)

MATCH RULES

- 90 minutes.
- 30 minutes of extra-time if necessary.
- Penalty shoot-out if scores still level.
- Five named substitutes.
- Maximum of three substitutions.

== See also ==
- 2009–10 Welsh Cup
- 2010 Welsh League Cup Final
