= 2011–12 York City F.C. season =

Association football club season

York City F.C.
2011–12 season
- Chairman: Jason McGill
- Manager: Gary Mills
- Ground: Bootham Crescent
- Conference Premier: 4th
- Play-offs: Winners (promoted)
- FA Cup: Fourth qualifying round (eliminated by Wrexham)
- FA Trophy: Winners
- Top goalscorer: League: Jason Walker (18); All: Matty Blair (20)
- Highest home attendance: 6,057 vs Mansfield Town, play-offs, 2 May 2012
- Lowest home attendance: 1,116 vs Solihull Moors, FA Trophy, 10 December 2011
- Average home league attendance: 3,117
Home colours	Away colours

The 2011–12 season was the 90th season of competitive association football and eighth season in the Football Conference played by York City Football Club, a professional football club based in York, North Yorkshire, England. Their eighth-place finish in 2010–11 meant it was their eighth successive season in the Conference Premier. The season covers the period from 1 July 2011 to 30 June 2012.

Gary Mills, who was starting his first full season as manager, signed 11 players before the summer transfer window closed. York occupied a play-off position for most of the season, and finished the Conference Premier season in fourth place. They beat Mansfield Town 2–1 on aggregate in the play-off semi-final. Luton Town were then beaten 2–1 in the 2012 Conference Premier play-off final at Wembley Stadium, which meant the club was promoted to League Two, returning into the Football League after an eight-year absence. Eight days beforehand, York won their first national knockout competition, with a 2–0 victory over Newport County at Wembley Stadium in the 2012 FA Trophy final. They were knocked out of the 2011–12 FA Cup in the fourth qualifying round, after being beaten 2–1 away to Wrexham.

30 players made at least one appearance in nationally organised first-team competition, and there were 19 different goalscorers. Goalkeeper Michael Ingham, defender James Meredith and midfielder Paddy McLaughlin missed only three of the 58 competitive matches played over the season. Matty Blair finished as leading scorer with 20 goals, of which 10 came in league competition, eight came in the FA Trophy and two came in the play-offs. The winner of the Clubman of the Year, voted for by the club's supporters, was Scott Kerr for his first full season with the club.

== Background and pre-season ==
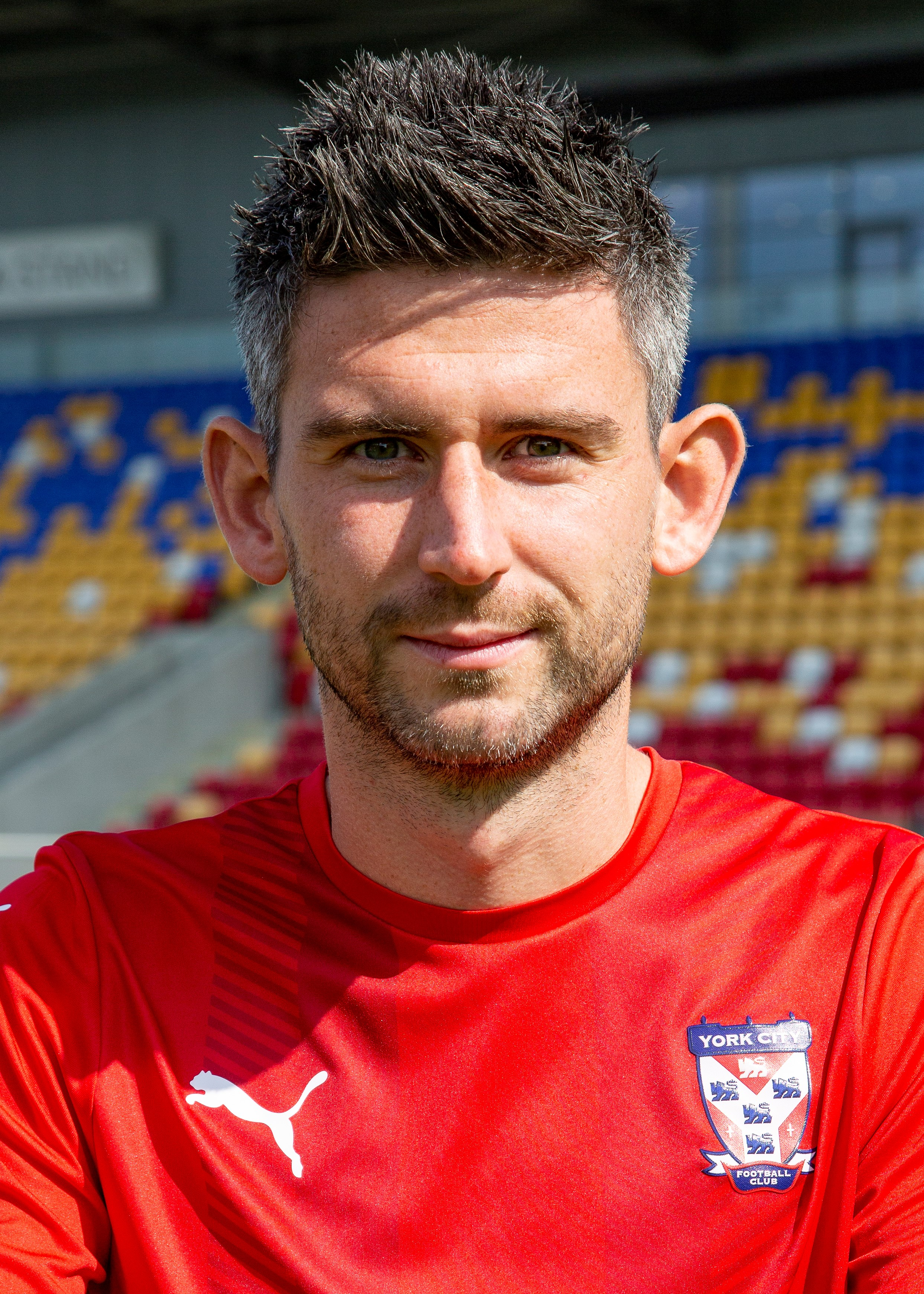
Paddy McLaughlin joined from Newcastle United.

Just over a month into the 2010–11 season, manager Martin Foyle resigned with York City 15th in the league table. Tamworth manager Gary Mills took over, and after pushing for a play-off place the team finished the 2010–11 Conference Premier in eighth place. Released following the end of the season were Neil Barrett, Chris Carruthers, Leon Constantine, Liam Darville, Michael Gash, Levi Mackin and Andy McWilliams. George Purcell, Michael Rankine, Jonathan Smith, Peter Till and Greg Young also left the club after departing for Dover Athletic, Aldershot Town, Swindon Town, Fleetwood Town and Alfreton Town respectively. Jamal Fyfield, Michael Ingham and James Meredith signed new contracts with York, with David McDermott being retained on non-contract terms.

New additions in defence ahead of the season's start included goalkeeper Paul Musselwhite from Lincoln City and defender Lanre Oyebanjo from Histon. Midfielders to sign were Paddy McLaughlin from Newcastle United, Adriano Moke from Jerez Industrial (via the Glenn Hoddle Academy), and Michael Potts from Blackburn Rovers, with winger Matty Blair joining from Kidderminster Harriers. Strikers Ashley Chambers, who had been on loan the previous season, and Liam Henderson signed from Championship clubs Leicester City and Watford respectively. Striker Jason Walker was the only player signed for a fee, having cost £60,000 from Luton Town.

New home and away kits were introduced for the second successive summer, the home kit featuring red shirts with a white 'V' shape decoration toward the top of the shirt, light blue shorts with white trims on each side and white socks. The away kit included light blue shirts with the same 'V' shape decoration, white shorts with light blue trims on each side and light blue socks. Pryers Solicitors continued as shirt sponsors for the third successive season.

Pre-season match details
Date	Opponents	Venue	Result	Score F–A	Scorers	Attendance	Ref.
8 July 2011	Tadcaster Albion	A	W	5–0	McLaughlin 27', Blair 30', Moke 46', Chambers 60', Walker 81'	840	
11 July 2011	Garforth Town	A	D	1–1	Walker 45'		
13 July 2011	Sunderland	H	L	1–2	Reed 64' pen.	5,148	
16 July 2011	Quorn	A	W	3–1	Reed 23', Oyebanjo 28', Walker 52'		
19 July 2011	Grantham Town	A	W	2–0	Moke 52', Walker 61'		
23 July 2011	Billingham Synthonia	A	D	1–1	Blair 45'		
30 July 2011	Hartlepool United	H	W	2–1	Chambers, Fyfield	1,241	
2 August 2011	FC Halifax Town	A	D	1–1	Smith 90'	807	
6 August 2011	Bolton Wanderers	H	L	0–1		1,416	

== Review ==
=== August ===
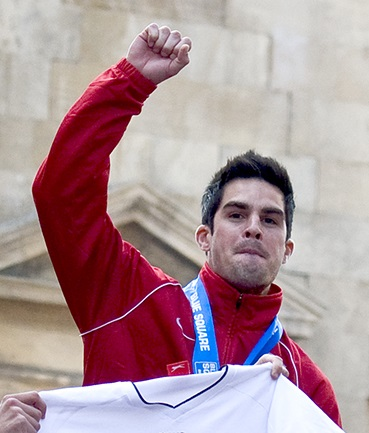
Jon Challinor was signed days after playing against York for Kettering Town.

Walker scored an 83rd-minute penalty kick and a 90th-minute header to give York a 2–1 victory away to Ebbsfleet United in the opening match of the season. A second victory came in York's first home match of the season, a 3–1 victory over Barrow, with Walker, McLaughlin and Blair scoring. Former Stockport County winger Danny Pilkington was signed on non-contract terms following a trial with the club. The team's first defeat of the season came after going down 1–0 at home to AFC Telford United, after former York striker Craig Farrell scored an 87th-minute goal. York responded to this by defeating Kettering Town 5–1 away, with Boucaud, Walker and Moke scoring in the first half and debutant Pilkington scoring the fifth in stoppage time. Shortly after this match, Kettering midfielder Jon Challinor was signed by York on a contract until January 2012. York picked up their first clean sheet of the season after drawing 0–0 away to Fleetwood Town. A second successive defeat at home came after losing 1–0 to Alfreton Town, with former York player Levi Mackin scoring the only goal with a penalty.

=== September ===
Walker scored what proved to be only a consolation after scoring in the 84th minute against Tamworth, with York losing 2–1 away after conceding two penalties, both of which were awarded from fouls committed by Chris Smith. York's first victory in four matches came after Jamie Reed scored an 88th-minute winner to give the team a 1–0 win at home to Bath City. This was followed by a 3–0 win away to league leaders Wrexham, with first half goals from McLaughlin, Chambers and Reed handing York victory. York then drew 2–2 at home to Darlington; Reed opened the scoring in the second minute with a shot into the top corner from the edge of the penalty area, and in the 79th minute Walker scored with a curling shot into the top corner to equalise for York. Chambers and Walker scored first half goals as York defeated Luton 3–0 at home. After a four-match unbeaten run York were defeated 3–2 away to Gateshead, with former York loanee Jon Shaw scoring their three goals, and Walker and a Curtis own goal making up York's tally.

=== October ===
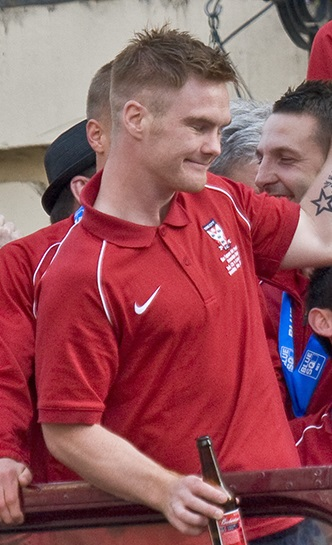
Jason Walker scored with a bicycle kick in York's 2–1 home win over Grimsby Town.

Following defeat to Gateshead, York beat Stockport County 2–1 away after Blair and Walker scored second-half goals. York then went on to beat Braintree Town 6–2 at home, with Chambers, McLaughlin, Fyfield, Walker and Moke scoring. Chambers scored in the 62nd minute with York's goal in a 1–1 draw away to Southport, before the home team scored an equaliser nine minutes from time. Chambers scored an 86th-minute winner in a 2–1 victory at home to Grimsby Town, in which Walker had earlier scored with a bicycle kick for York in the first half. Walker scored twice at home against Cambridge United to give York a 2–2 draw, with the equaliser being scored direct from a free kick in the 89th minute. York then beat Hayes & Yeading United 4–2 away, with Walker, Challinor, McLaughlin and Chambers scoring. York were knocked out of the FA Cup in the fourth qualifying round after losing 2–1 away to Conference Premier league leaders Wrexham, with McLaughlin scoring York's only goal.

=== November ===
A second match with Wrexham in eight days finished in a 0–0 draw at home, with Ingham making a number of fine saves to preserve the clean sheet. Henderson was signed by fellow Conference Premier club Forest Green Rovers on a one-month loan. York drew 0–0 draw away to Barrow, with Walker and Boucaud being sent off during stoppage time. Striker Moses Ashikodi was signed on loan from league rivals Kettering until January 2012. Reed gave York the lead away to Forest Green after scoring a penalty in the 83rd minute, before the home team scored an equaliser in the fourth minute of stoppage time. York defeated Lincoln 2–0 at home with Pilkington and McLaughlin scoring in each half.

=== December ===
A second successive victory came after a 7–0 win at home to Kettering, in which Ashikodi scored against his parent club for his first for York goal. The other scorers were Reed, Challinor, Blair, McLaughlin and Chambers. York were held to a 0–0 draw away to Telford, in which Boucaud, Blair and Walker were denied from scoring by opposition goalkeeper Ryan Young during the first 15 minutes. Challinor scored during stoppage time to secure an FA Trophy first round replay with Conference North team Solihull Moors, with the match ending a 2–2 draw at home. York won the replay away to Solihull 3–0, with Smith scoring his first goal of the season and Blair scoring twice. York suffered their first league defeat since September after losing 3–2 at home to Kidderminster. Henderson scored his first goal for York with the equaliser away to Mansfield Town on Boxing Day, which finished a 1–1 draw.

=== January ===
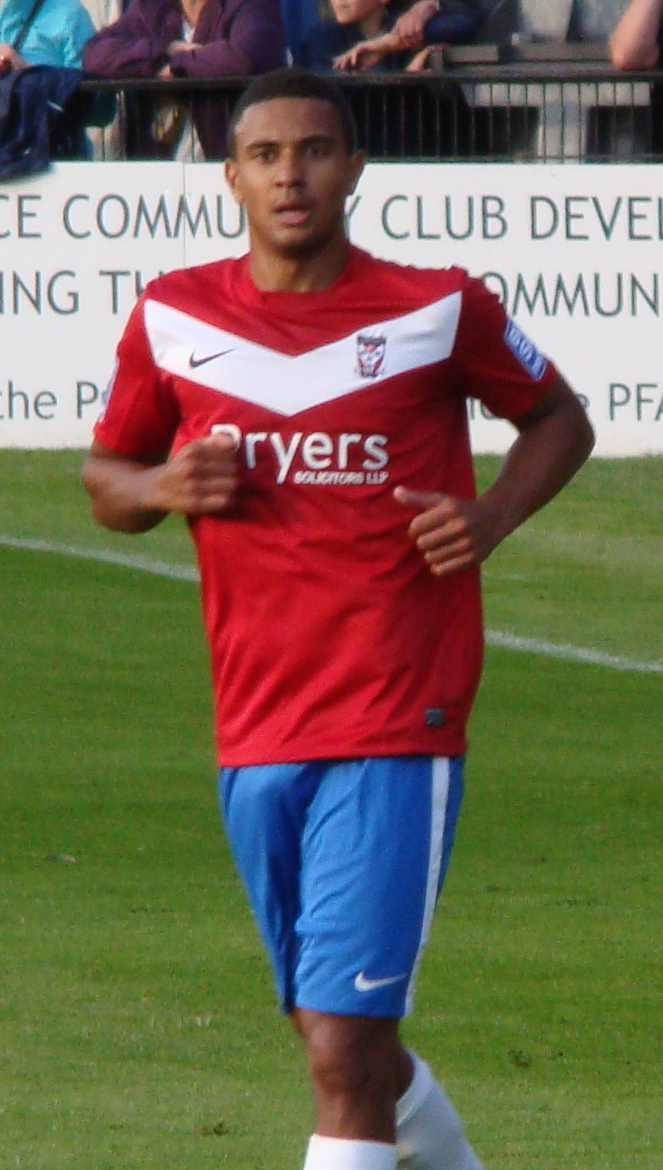
James Meredith scored his first goal of the season in a 3–2 home victory over Ebbsfleet United.

York were 2–0 down in their New Year's Day fixture at home to Mansfield until the 77th minute when Blair scored, and in the first minute of stoppage time substitute Fyfield scored the equaliser to draw the match at 2–2. Ashikodi was signed on a permanent contract until the end of the season, having scored one goal in six appearances for the club while on loan. Challinor signed an extended contract until the end of the season, while McDermott was allowed to join Telford after being unable to break into the team. Henderson joined Forest Green for a second loan spell, signing until the end of the season. On the same day, York signed former Fleetwood midfielder Scott Brown on a contract until the end of the season. Blair scored both of York's goals in a 2–0 victory away to Lincoln, which was the team's first win in five league matches. Striker Matthew Blinkhorn was signed on a contract until the end of the season after his contract with League of Ireland Premier Division club Sligo Rovers expired.

York won their FA Trophy second round match away to Salisbury City 6–2, with Blair, Reed, McLaughlin and Blinkhorn scoring the goals. York defeated Ebbsfleet 3–2 at home for a second successive league win, in which Blair scored twice and Meredith scored his first goal of the season. Smith scored York's goal in a 1–1 draw away to Kidderminster with a 57th-minute header, before the home team equalised in the 85th minute. York fought back from two goals down in the following match away to Darlington, with Smith and Chambers scoring in the second half. Transfer deadline day saw the departure of Boucaud to Luton for a fee of £25,000, while midfielder Erik Tønne was signed on loan from Sheffield United until the end of the season.

=== February ===
Free agents Chris Doig, a defender who previously played for Aldershot Town, and Ben Swallow, a winger who previously played for Bristol Rovers, were signed on contracts until the end of the season. Middlesbrough defender Ben Gibson was signed on loan until the end of the season. York progressed to the quarter-finals of the FA Trophy after Ebbsfleet were beaten 1–0 at home in the third round, courtesy of a second half Blair goal. Reed and Blinkhorn scored late goals to give York a 2–1 victory at home to Stockport, with the visitors having taken the lead earlier in the second half. York suffered their first defeat in eight league matches after losing 2–1 at home to Gateshead. Progression to the semi-final of the FA Trophy for the third time in five seasons came after York defeated Grimsby 1–0 away in the quarter-final, in which Scott Kerr scored his first goal for the club.

=== March ===
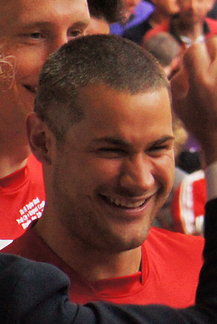
Jamie Reed scored York's goal in the 1–0 home win against Luton Town in the FA Trophy semi-final first leg.

Oyebanjo, with his first goal for the club, and Walker scored to give York a 2–0 victory at home to Hayes. This was followed by a 0–0 home draw with Tamworth. York defeated Luton in the first leg of the FA Trophy semi-final at home, with Reed scoring a penalty in a 1–0 victory. Fyfield scored the winning goal away to Grimsby during stoppage time with a 25-yard shot, after Reed and Smith had scored York's earlier goals in a 3–2 victory. York reached the FA Trophy final for the second time in four seasons after drawing 1–1 away to Luton in the semi-final second leg, with Blair scoring a 90th-minute equaliser, meaning the team went through 2–1 on aggregate. Free agent midfielder Eugen Bopp was signed on a contract until the end of the season after a trial. York were beaten 2–1 at home to Southport, with Reed's 84th-minute goal not being enough to earn York any points, after the visitors had scored twice earlier in the second half. McLaughlin scored for the first time since December with the only goal in a 1–0 victory away to Bath, which restored York's position in the play-offs. A second goal in two matches from McLaughlin saw York equalise away to Luton in the 81st minute, before Meredith scored an 86th-minute winner in a 2–1 victory.

=== April ===
McLaughlin's third goal in three matches came in a 2–1 defeat away to Newport County, with the home team scoring the winner 20 minutes from time through Romone Rose. York lost a second match in a row when being beaten 1–0 at home by league leaders Fleetwood, in which former York striker Richard Brodie scored the only goal in the 73rd minute. Blair and Oyebanjo scored in the second half to give York a 2–0 victory away to Alfreton. Swallow was prematurely released by the club because of an internal issue. York drew 1–1 at home to Newport with Walker scoring a second half equaliser, which was his first goal from open play since 22 October. Musselwhite was forced to make his debut in York's away match against Cambridge due to an injury to Ingham, with York winning 1–0 through a second half Walker goal. York were guaranteed a play-off place after beating Braintree 1–0 away, with Tønne scoring his first goal for the club in the 75th minute. The league campaign concluded after a 1–0 victory at home to Forest Green, with Moke scoring in the 82nd minute. The result meant York finished fourth in the Conference Premier table and that they would play third-placed Mansfield in the play-off semi-final. Following the match, Kerr was named as the season's Clubman of the Year, voted for by the club's supporters.

=== May ===
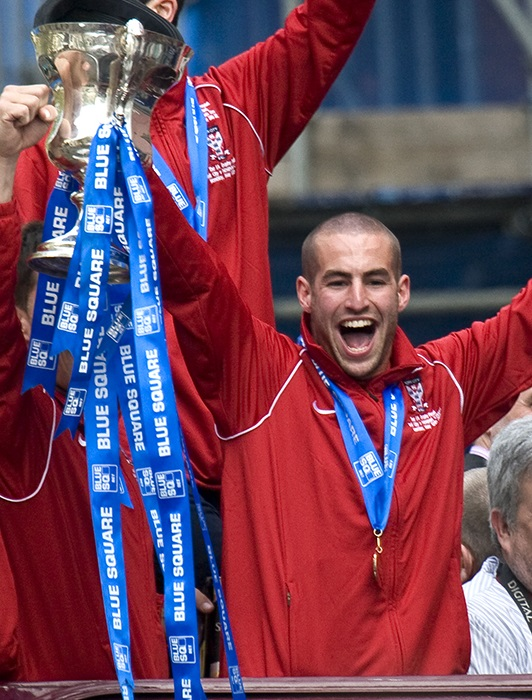
Matty Blair scored the winning goal in the 2012 Conference Premier play-off final.

York drew 1–1 with Mansfield at home in the first leg of the play-off semi-final. Mansfield took the lead in the 26th minute after Exodus Geohaghon's long throw was headed in by Ross Dyer, before York equalised on 42 minutes after Geohaghon scored an own goal from a Challinor cross. York defeated Mansfield 1–0 after extra time in the second leg after Blair scored a header from a Walker cross in the 111th minute. With an aggregate score of 2–1 York progressed to the play-off final to play Luton. The club won its first national knockout competition, and first piece of silverware in 19 years, after Newport were defeated 2–0 in the 2012 FA Trophy final at Wembley Stadium, with Blair and Oyebanjo scoring in the second half. Days after the Trophy victory, plans for a community stadium to be built at Monks Cross, which would be shared by York City and rugby league team York City Knights, were approved by City of York Council.

On 20 May 2012, York regained their Football League status with promotion to League Two after a 2–1 win over Luton in the 2012 Conference Premier play-off final at Wembley Stadium. Luton took the lead when Andre Gray scored in the second minute, before Chambers scored the equaliser on 26 minutes with a low shot from a Smith hooked cross. The winner came two minutes into the second half after Blair, despite being in an offside position, scored from close range after latching onto Daniel Parslow's header. After the match, Blair was quoted as saying "I scored the goal and it feels unbelievable but I'm not taking anything away from the other lads today. The back five, and Daniel Parslow in front, defended like heroes and were brilliant all game". Mills summarised York's achievements by saying "To come to Wembley Stadium two weeks running and do the double is an incredible feeling. In fact, with the ground announcement, it's been a terrific treble and probably the best hat-trick ever at York City Football Club".

The day after the play-off final, thousands turned out to witness the club's players, management, staff and directors ride through York city centre on an open-topped bus, in celebration of what The Press described as "an unsurpassed nine days in the Minstermen's proud existence".

== Summary and aftermath ==
York occupied a play-off position for the majority of the season, briefly rising as high as first place during the first month of the season while never dropping below 14th. For the third time in the space of six seasons, York had a better record away than at home in the league. The team won 12 matches, drew eight and lost three away, compared to winning 11, drawing six and losing six at home. Ingham, McLaughlin and Meredith recorded the highest number of appearances during the season, each appearing in 55 of York's 58 matches. Blair was top scorer in all competitions with 20 goals, followed by Walker, whose 18 goals made him York's leading league scorer. Three other players, Chambers, McLaughlin and Reed, reached double figures.

Prior to the club's Football League return, York released Ashikodi, Blinkhorn, Bopp and Brown, while Meredith, Moke and Pilkington left on their own accord for Bradford City, Cambridge and Kidderminster. Challinor, Chambers, Doig, Fyfield, Ingham, Kerr and Parslow signed new contracts with the club. New players to join were defender Danny Blanchett from Burton Albion, midfielders Lee Bullock from Bradford, John McReady from Darlington and Jonathan Smith from Swindon, winger Michael Coulson from Grimsby, and striker Oli Johnson from Oxford United. Midfielder Tom Platt was promoted to the first-team squad from the youth team after signing a professional contract with the club.

== Match details ==
League positions are sourced by Statto, while the remaining information is referenced individually.

=== Conference Premier ===
Conference Premier match details
Date	League position	Opponents	Venue	Result	Score F–A	Scorers	Attendance	Ref.
13 August 2011	5th	Ebbsfleet United	A	W	2–1	Walker (2) 83' pen., 90'	1,522	
16 August 2011	2nd	Barrow	H	W	3–1	Walker 7', McLaughlin 45', Blair 90'	3,075	
20 August 2011	5th	AFC Telford United	H	L	0–1		2,723	
23 August 2011	3rd	Kettering Town	A	W	5–1	Boucaud 20', Walker (2) 21', 31', Moke 39', Pilkington 90'	1,595	
26 August 2011	1st	Fleetwood Town	A	D	0–0		2,111	
29 August 2011	6th	Alfreton Town	H	L	0–1		3,166	
10 September 2011	14th	Tamworth	A	L	1–2	Walker 84'	1,012	
13 September 2011	9th	Bath City	H	W	1–0	Reed 88'	2,030	
17 September 2011	8th	Wrexham	A	W	3–0	McLaughlin 4', Chambers 21', Reed 24'	3,872	
20 September 2011	7th	Darlington	H	D	2–2	Reed 2', Walker 79'	2,844	
24 September 2011	5th	Luton Town	H	W	3–0	Chambers (2) 9', 45+2', Walker 31'	3,570	
27 September 2011	8th	Gateshead	A	L	2–3	Walker 23', Curtis 88' o.g.	1,604	
1 October 2011	6th	Stockport County	A	W	2–1	Blair 52', Walker 86'	3,753	
8 October 2011	4th	Braintree Town	H	W	6–2	Chambers 15', McLaughlin (2) 28', 41', Fyfield 37', Walker 72' pen., Moke 85'	2,640	
11 October 2011	4th	Southport	A	D	1–1	Chambers 62'	1,107	
15 October 2011	3rd	Grimsby Town	H	W	2–1	Walker 34', Chambers 86'	3,872	
18 October 2011	3rd	Cambridge United	H	D	2–2	Walker (2) 21', 89'	2,711	
22 October 2011	3rd	Hayes & Yeading United	A	W	4–2	Walker 14', Challinor 19', McLaughlin 61', Chambers 76'	525	
5 November 2011	4th	Wrexham	H	D	0–0		4,295	
19 November 2011	5th	Barrow	A	D	0–0		2,190	
26 November 2011	5th	Forest Green Rovers	A	D	1–1	Reed 83' pen.	1,157	
29 November 2011	4th	Lincoln City	H	W	2–0	Pilkington 4', McLaughlin 56'	3,155	
3 December 2011	4th	Kettering Town	H	W	7–0	Reed (2) 6', 12', Challinor 30', Blair 45', McLaughlin 50', Chambers 65', Ashikodi 77'	2,899	
6 December 2011	3rd	AFC Telford United	A	D	0–0		1,601	
19 December 2011	4th	Kidderminster Harriers	H	L	2–3	Blair 20', McGurk 68'	2,830	
26 December 2011	4th	Mansfield Town	A	D	1–1	Henderson 62'	3,551	
1 January 2012	5th	Mansfield Town	H	D	2–2	Blair 77', Fyfield 90+1'	4,284	
7 January 2012	4th	Lincoln City	A	W	2–0	Blair (2) 64', 72'	3,048	
21 January 2012	4th	Ebbsfleet United	H	W	3–2	Blair (2) 10', 53', Meredith 67'	2,973	
24 January 2012	4th	Kidderminster Harriers	A	D	1–1	Smith 57'	2,417	
28 January 2012	4th	Darlington	A	D	2–2	Smith 60', Chambers 61'	6,413	
18 February 2012	4th	Stockport County	H	W	2–1	Reed 84', Blinkhorn 90+6'	3,370	
22 February 2012	4th	Gateshead	H	L	1–2	Reed 65'	2,683	
3 March 2012	4th	Hayes & Yeading United	H	W	2–0	Oyebanjo 57', Walker 90+4' pen.	2,603	
6 March 2012	4th	Tamworth	H	D	0–0		2,249	
13 March 2012	5th	Grimsby Town	A	W	3–2	Reed 19', Smith 47', Fyfield 90+3'	4,250	
24 March 2012	6th	Southport	H	L	1–2	Reed 84'	3,465	
27 March 2012	5th	Bath City	A	W	1–0	McLaughlin 50'	565	
30 March 2012	4th	Luton Town	A	W	2–1	McLaughlin 81', Meredith 86'	5,925	
3 April 2012	4th	Newport County	A	L	1–2	McLaughlin 39'	1,241	
7 April 2012	4th	Fleetwood Town	H	L	0–1		4,048	
9 April 2012	4th	Alfreton Town	A	W	2–0	Blair 69', Oyebanjo 76'	1,603	
14 April 2012	5th	Newport County	H	D	1–1	Walker 59'	2,824	
17 April 2012	4th	Cambridge United	A	W	1–0	Walker 64'	2,211	
21 April 2012	4th	Braintree Town	A	W	1–0	Tønne 75'	1,127	
28 April 2012	4th	Forest Green Rovers	H	W	1–0	Moke 82'	3,391	

=== League table (part) ===
Final Conference Premier table (part)
Pos	Club	Pld	W	D	L	F	A	GD	Pts
2nd	Wrexham	46	30	8	8	85	33	+52	98
3rd	Mansfield Town	46	25	14	7	87	48	+39	89
4th	York City	46	23	14	9	81	45	+36	83
5th	Luton Town	46	22	15	9	78	42	+36	81
6th	Kidderminster Harriers	46	22	10	14	82	63	+19	76
Key	Pos = League position; Pld = Matches played; W = Matches won; D = Matches drawn; L = Matches lost; F = Goals for; A = Goals against; GD = Goal difference; Pts = Points								
Source									

=== FA Cup ===
FA Cup match details
Round	Date	Opponents	Venue	Result	Score F–A	Scorers	Attendance	Ref.
Fourth qualifying round	29 October 2011	Wrexham	A	L	1–2	McLaughlin 58'	2,252	

=== FA Trophy ===
FA Trophy match details
Round	Date	Opponents	Venue	Result	Score F–A	Scorers	Attendance	Ref.
First round	10 December 2011	Solihull Moors	H	D	2–2	Blair 6', Challinor 90+3'	1,116	
First round replay	13 December 2011	Solihull Moors	A	W	3–0	Smith 12', Blair (2) 61', 76'	275	
Second round	14 January 2012	Salisbury City	A	W	6–2	Blair (2) 19', 21', Reed 26', McLaughlin (2) 34', 87', Blinkhorn 70'	827	
Third round	14 February 2012	Ebbsfleet United	H	W	1–0	Blair 48'	1,419	
Quarter-final	25 February 2012	Grimsby Town	A	W	1–0	Kerr 83'	3,662	
Semi-final first leg	10 March 2012	Luton Town	H	W	1–0	Reed 14' pen.	3,365	
Semi-final second leg	17 March 2012	Luton Town	A	D	1–1; 2–1 agg.	Blair 90'	5,796	
Final	12 May 2012	Newport County	N	W	2–0	Blair 65', Oyebanjo 73'	19,844	

=== Conference Premier play-offs ===
Conference Premier play-offs match details
Round	Date	Opponents	Venue	Result	Score F–A	Scorers	Attendance	Ref.
Semi-final first leg	2 May 2012	Mansfield Town	H	D	1–1	Geohaghon 42' o.g.	6,057	
Semi-final second leg	7 May 2012	Mansfield Town	A	W	1–0; 2–1 agg.	Blair 111'	7,295	
Final	20 May 2012	Luton Town	N	W	2–1	Chambers 26', Blair 47'	39,265	

== Transfers ==
=== In ===
Date	Player	Club†	Fee	Ref.
25 May 2011	Ashley Chambers	(Leicester City)	Free	
26 May 2011	Liam Henderson	(Watford)	Free	
1 June 2011	Matty Blair	(Kidderminster Harriers)	Compensation	
16 June 2011	Paul Musselwhite	(Lincoln City)	Free	
16 June 2011	Jason Walker	Luton Town	£60,000	
23 June 2011	Michael Potts	(Blackburn Rovers)	Free	
24 June 2011	Adriano Moke	(Jerez Industrial)	Free	
25 June 2011	Lanre Oyebanjo	(Histon)	Compensation	
30 June 2011	Paddy McLaughlin	(Newcastle United)	Free	
19 August 2011	Danny Pilkington	(Stockport County)	Free	
25 August 2011	Jon Challinor	Kettering Town	Free	
2 January 2012	Moses Ashikodi	Kettering Town	Free	
6 January 2012	Scott Brown	Fleetwood Town	Free	
10 January 2012	Matthew Blinkhorn	(Sligo Rovers)	Free	
2 February 2012	Chris Doig	(Aldershot Town)	Free	
2 February 2012	Ben Swallow	(Bristol Rovers)	Free	
22 March 2012	Eugen Bopp	(Carl Zeiss Jena)	Free	

† Brackets around club names denote the player's contract with that club had expired before he joined York.

=== Out ===
Date	Player	Club†	Fee	Ref.
21 June 2011	Jonathan Smith	Swindon Town	£30,000	
16 July 2011	George Purcell	Dover Athletic	Undisclosed	
5 January 2012	David McDermott	(AFC Telford United)	Released	
31 January 2012	Andre Boucaud	Luton Town	£25,000	
13 April 2012	Ben Swallow	(Newport County)	Released	
29 May 2012	Moses Ashikodi	(Ebbsfleet United)	Released	
2 June 2012	Ben White	(Barton Town Old Boys)	Released	
19 June 2012	Danny Pilkington	(Kidderminster Harriers)	Free	
29 June 2012	James Meredith	(Bradford City)	Free	
3 July 2012	Matthew Blinkhorn	(Hyde)	Released	
3 July 2012	Eugen Bopp	(Dunkirk)	Released	
3 July 2012	Scott Brown	(Macclesfield Town)	Released	
10 July 2012	Adriano Moke	Cambridge United	Undisclosed	

† Brackets around club names denote the player joined that club after his York contract expired.

=== Loans in ===
Date	Player	Club	Return	Ref.
23 November 2011	Moses Ashikodi	Kettering Town	Made permanent 2 January 2012	
31 January 2012	Erik Tønne	Sheffield United	End of season	
9 February 2012	Ben Gibson	Middlesbrough	End of season	

=== Loans out ===
Date	Player	Club	Return	Ref.
18 November 2011	Liam Henderson	Forest Green Rovers	21 December 2011	
6 January 2012	Liam Henderson	Forest Green Rovers	End of season	

== Appearances and goals ==
Numbers in parentheses denote appearances as substitute.
Players with names struck through and marked † left the club during the playing season.
Players with names in italics and marked * were on loan from another club for the whole of their season with York.
Players listed with no appearances have been in the matchday squad but only as unused substitutes.
Key to positions: GK – Goalkeeper; DF – Defender; MF – Midfielder; FW – Forward

Players included in matchday squads
No.	Pos.	Nat.	Name	League		FA Cup		FA Trophy		Play-offs		Total		Discipline	
No.	Pos.	Nat.	Name	Apps	Goals	Apps	Goals	Apps	Goals	Apps	Goals	Apps	Goals	A yellow rectangle, denoting the yellow penalty card shown to a player being cautioned	A red rectangle, denoting the red penalty card shown to a player being sent off
1	GK	ENG	Paul Musselwhite	3	0	0	0	0	0	0	0	3	0	0	0
2	DF	IRL	Lanre Oyebanjo	19 (2)	2	1	0	3	1	2	0	25 (2)	3	3	0
3	DF	AUS	James Meredith	43	2	1	0	8	0	3	0	55	2	9	0
4	DF	ENG	Chris Smith	31	3	0	0	7	1	3	0	41	4	11	0
5	DF	ENG	David McGurk	18 (1)	1	1	0	2	0	0	0	21 (1)	1	8	0
6	DF	WAL	Daniel Parslow	17 (10)	0	1	0	5 (2)	0	3	0	26 (12)	0	3	0
7	FW	WAL	Jamie Reed	17 (18)	10	1	0	3 (2)	2	0 (1)	0	21 (21)	12	6	0
8	MF	ENG	Scott Kerr	33 (1)	0	1	0	7	1	0	0	41 (1)	1	5	0
9	FW	ENG	Jason Walker	29 (1)	18	0	0	6	0	3	0	38 (1)	18	6	1
10	FW	ENG	Ashley Chambers	34 (8)	9	0 (1)	0	2 (3)	0	3	1	39 (12)	10	1	0
11	FW	ENG	Liam Henderson	2 (4)	1	1	0	0	0	0	0	3 (4)	1	0	0
12	MF	ENG	Danny Pilkington	10 (8)	2	0	0	2 (2)	0	0	0	12 (10)	2	0	0
13	MF	GER	Eugen Bopp	1 (1)	0	0	0	0	0	0	0	1 (1)	0	1	0
14	MF	ENG	Michael Potts	2 (8)	0	1	0	0 (1)	0	0 (1)	0	3 (10)	0	1	0
15	MF	TRI	~~Andre Boucaud~~ †	23 (1)	1	0	0	1	0	0	0	24 (1)	1	3	1
15	MF	NOR	Erik Tønne *	2 (1)	1	0	0	1	0	0	0	3 (1)	1	0	0
16	DF	ENG	Jamal Fyfield	25 (8)	3	0	0	4 (1)	0	1 (1)	0	30 (10)	3	5	0
17	MF	ENG	Matty Blair	37 (4)	10	0 (1)	0	7	8	3	2	47 (5)	20	7	0
18	MF	POR	Adriano Moke	11 (15)	3	1	0	0 (5)	0	0 (2)	0	12 (22)	3	2	0
19	MF	ENG	Scott Brown	6 (1)	0	0	0	1 (1)	0	0 (1)	0	7 (3)	0	1	1
20	MF	ENG	Jon Challinor	35 (4)	2	0 (1)	0	7 (1)	1	3	0	45 (6)	3	7	0
21	FW	ENG	Matthew Blinkhorn	3 (12)	1	0	0	1 (3)	1	0	0	4 (15)	2	0	0
22	MF	WAL	~~Ben Swallow~~ †	0 (2)	0	0	0	1	0	0	0	1 (2)	0	0	0
23	DF	SCO	Chris Doig	10	0	0	0	2	0	3	0	15	0	1	0
24	GK	NIR	Michael Ingham	43	0	1	0	8	0	3	0	55	0	1	0
25	MF	ENG	Reece Kelly	0 (1)	0	0	0	0	0	0	0	0 (1)	0	0	0
26	MF	NIR	Paddy McLaughlin	42 (2)	10	1	1	7	2	2 (1)	0	52 (3)	13	6	0
27	DF	ENG	Ben Gibson *	8	0	0	0	2	0	1	0	11	0	1	1
28	FW	ENG	Moses Ashikodi	2 (6)	1	0	0	1 (2)	0	0	0	3 (8)	1	2	0
29	GK	ENG	Ben White	0	0	0	0	0	0	0	0	0	0	0	0

Players not included in matchday squads
No.	Pos.	Nat.	Name
19	MF	ENG	~~David McDermott~~ †

== See also ==
- List of York City F.C. seasons
