= Scott Brown (footballer, born May 1985) =

English footballer (born 1985)

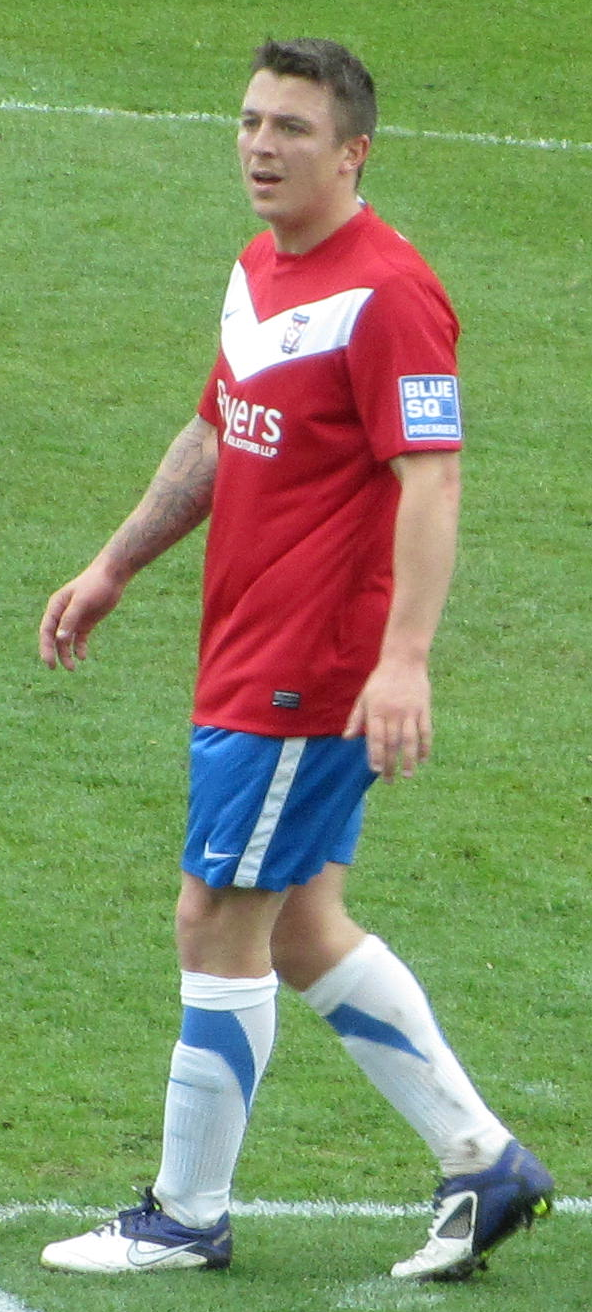
- Brown playing for York City in 2012

Personal information
- Date of birth: 8 May 1985 (age 41)
- Place of birth: Runcorn, England
- Height: 5 ft 7 in (1.70 m)
- Position: Central midfielder

Youth career
- –2004: Everton

Senior career*
Years	Team	Apps	(Gls)
2004–2007	Bristol City	63	(5)
2007	→ Cheltenham Town (loan)	3	(0)
2007–2009	Cheltenham Town	21	(0)
2008–2009	→ Port Vale (loan)	6	(1)
2009	Port Vale	12	(0)
2010	Cheltenham Town	1	(0)
2010–2011	Morecambe	32	(3)
2011–2012	Fleetwood Town	9	(0)
2012	York City	7	(0)
2012	Macclesfield Town	1	(0)
2012–2013	Chester	22	(1)
2013–2014	Southport	44	(4)
2014–2016	Grimsby Town	36	(1)
2016–2019	Accrington Stanley	106	(4)
2019–2021	Harrogate Town	8	(0)
2019–2020	→ Warrington Town (loan)	12	(1)
2020–2021	→ Warrington Town (loan)	5	(0)
Total		388	(20)

International career
2000–2001	England U15	3	(0)
2001–2002	England U17	9	(0)
2002–2003	England U18	3	(0)
2003–2004	England U19	7	(2)
- * Club domestic league appearances and goals as of 16:24, 11 April 2020 (UTC)

Scott Brown (born 8 May 1985) is an English former professional footballer who played as a central midfielder. He has played in the English Football League for Bristol City, Cheltenham Town, Port Vale, Morecambe and Accrington Stanley.

Starting his career with Everton in their youth system before moving on to Bristol City, having failed to make an appearance for Everton. After three years with City, he transferred to Cheltenham Town in January 2007. Not long after joining Cheltenham, he broke his leg and spent the next 18 months in recovery. then had a brief spell with Port Vale before signing for Morecambe in 2010. After a brief spell with Fleetwood Town, he signed with York City in January 2012. He played for York in the victorious 2012 Conference Premier play-off final at Wembley Stadium, which saw the club promoted to League Two. He had a brief spell at Macclesfield Town in August 2012 before joining Chester the following month. He helped Chester to win both the Conference North title and the Cheshire Senior Cup in the 2012–13 season.

Brown signed with Southport in July 2013 and stayed with the club for one season before joining Conference Premier club Grimsby Town for an 18-month stay in June 2014. He signed with Accrington Stanley in January 2016 and helped the club win the League Two title in the 2017–18 season. He joined Harrogate Town in May 2019 and spent much of the 2019–20 and 2020–21 seasons loan at Warrington Town.

== Club career ==
=== Early career ===
Born in Runcorn, Cheshire, Brown progressed through the Everton youth system, having joined the club at under-nines level. He was part of the team that reached the 2002 FA Youth Cup final, which Everton lost 4–2 on aggregate to Aston Villa. After not making a senior appearance for the club he was released in 2004. He then joined Port Vale on trial in July 2004, under manager Martin Foyle, but was not signed to the club on a permanent contract.

=== Bristol City ===
In August 2004, he turned professional when he signed for Bristol City when Brian Tinnion offered him an initial three-month contract. In October 2005, Brown and City teammates David Partridge and Bradley Orr were arrested on suspicion of violent disorder after an incident in a nightclub. They were later charged with affray, as was teammate Steve Brooker. Brown denied the offence but admitted the lesser charge of a section 4 public-order offence. His three teammates were sent to prison. Brown escaped this punishment and instead was given 120 hours' community service for his part in the drunken brawl.

==== Cheltenham Town (loan) ====
He was voted the Professional Footballers' Association Fans' Player of the Month for September 2006. Brown joined fellow League One club Cheltenham Town in January 2007. He broke his leg in a collision with teammate Damian Spencer in a match against his former team and was ruled out for the rest of the 2006–07 season. His full recovery from the double leg fracture and dislocated ankle took a total of 18 months despite the surgeon initially fearing that Brown would struggle ever to walk properly again. Despite having left Bristol City halfway through the 2006–07 season he was presented with a promotion medal by Gary Johnson for his contribution in the first half of the campaign.

==== Port Vale (loan) ====
In November 2008, Brown went to Port Vale on loan after failing to make an appearance under manager Martin Allen. He scored on his debut on 22 November, in a 4–2 defeat to Wycombe Wanderers at Vale Park. In January 2009, Vale signed Brown on a free transfer after his Cheltenham contract expired. With 19 appearances for Vale in 2008–09, he was released upon the season's conclusion.

=== Cheltenham Town ===
He rejoined Cheltenham on 25 March 2010 on non-contract terms, but was released by the club along with seven other players in May, having only played 16 minutes in the final match of the season.

=== Morecambe ===
In July 2010, he joined Grimsby Town on trial and played in the club's 3–0 win over Winterton Rangers. In September 2010, he signed with Morecambe. He scored three goals in 33 matches before being released at the end of the season.

=== Fleetwood Town and York City ===
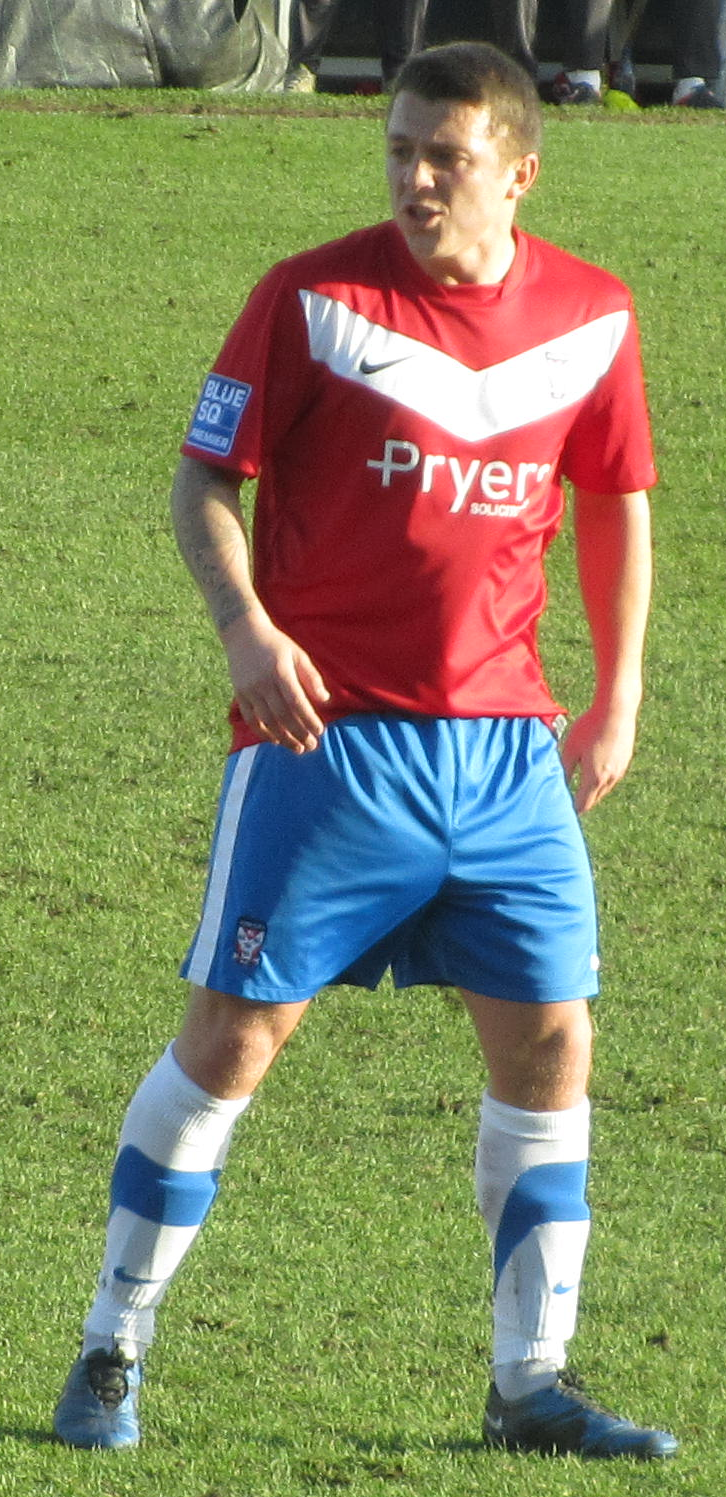
Brown playing for York City in 2012

After leaving Morecambe Brown had a brief trial spell at Wrexham, before signing for Conference Premier club Fleetwood Town on 8 August 2011, on a contract lasting until 2 January 2012. He made nine appearances for the club before leaving when his contract expired. He signed for another Conference Premier, York City, on 6 January 2012 on a contract until the end of 2011–12. He entered the 2012 Conference Premier play-off final at Wembley Stadium on 20 May as a 37th-minute substitute, with York going on to win 2–1, meaning the club returned to the Football League after an eight-year absence with promotion to League Two. Brown finished the season with 10 appearances for York before being released by the club.

=== Macclesfield Town ===
On 10 August 2012, Brown signed for Conference Premier club Macclesfield Town after a trial with the club. He made his debut later that same day, replacing Sam Wedgbury minutes before the end of a 2–1 defeat by Hereford United at Edgar Street. However, he left Moss Rose at the end of the month after the club cancelled his non-contract registration. Brown went on to label Steve King a liar and "a joke", and called the club a "sinking ship" on Twitter. He signed a short-term deal with Conference North club Chester on 5 September 2012. He remained at the Deva Stadium until the end of 2012–13 as Chester won the Conference North title. He also made a substitute appearance in the final of the Cheshire Senior Cup, as Chester beat Stalybridge Celtic 2–1 at Wincham Park. He left the club in May 2013; manager Neil Young stated that "his attitude and professionalism was an example to others".

=== Southport ===
Brown signed for Conference Premier club Southport on 13 July 2013. He was named as captain after John Coleman took over as manager following the sacking of Alan Wright, and was named as the club's Player of the Month in December 2013 and February 2014. He missed just two league matches all season as he helped the Southport to finish two points above the relegation zone in 2013–14. Supporters voted him as the club's Player of the Year.

=== Grimsby Town ===
On 4 June 2014, Brown signed a one-year contract with Conference Premier club Grimsby Town. Despite the good form of central midfielders Craig Clay and Craig Disley, Brown made 38 appearances and scored one goal for Grimsby in 2014–15. He played in the play-off final at Wembley Stadium, which ended in a 1–1 draw with Bristol Rovers with Grimsby losing on penalties. Brown left Grimsby by mutual consent on 26 January 2016.

=== Accrington Stanley ===
On 27 January 2016, Brown joined Accrington Stanley on a contract running until the end of 2015–16 after being signed by former Southport manager John Coleman. He won a place on the Football League team of the week for his performances in wins over Leyton Orient and Newport County in March. He scored three goals in 15 appearances over the remainder of the season and played in both legs of the play-off semi-final defeat to AFC Wimbledon. He signed a new two-year contract in June 2016. He made 32 appearances in the 2016–17 campaign, and was sent off three times, in matches against Colchester United, Cheltenham Town and Yeovil Town. He scored two goals in 44 appearances in the 2017–18 season as Accrington won promotion as champions of League Two and admitted to losing his phone and house keys during the promotion celebrations. He was offered a new contract by Accrington at the end of the season. He appeared 37 times during the 2018–19 season and was reported to have entered talks over a new contract in the summer.

=== Harrogate Town ===
Brown signed for National League club Harrogate Town on 20 May 2019. He joined Northern Premier League Premier Division club Warrington Town on a one-month loan on 24 December 2019. On 22 January, the loan was extended until the end of the 2019–20 season. As a result of the COVID-19 pandemic in England, the Northern Premier League season was formally abandoned on 26 March. Harrogate reached the play-off final at Wembley Stadium, beating Notts County 3–1 to reach the English Football League for the first time, though Brown did not feature for the club in the second half of the campaign. He returned on a season-long loan to Warrington Town on 25 September 2020, with manager Paul Carden admitting that "Harrogate have done us a right touch with the deal they have given us because we shouldn't have him for what we're contributing". Speaking a week later, Brown said that he was enjoying playing for Warrington. However, he broke his leg in a game against Buxton at the end of October, which led to the game being abandoned. He had a tibia and fibula break and was ruled out for the rest of the season. As it happened the Northern Premier League season was curtailed after just nine games on 24 February 2021, with previous results expunged from the records. In May 2021, he was named as one of eight players not to be retained by Harrogate manager Simon Weaver.

== International career ==
Brown made his debut for the England under-15 team in the 1–0 defeat to Northern Ireland on 29 October 2000 in the Victory Shield. He earned two more caps for the under-15s, appearing in matches against the Netherlands and Germany in February 2001. His debut for the under-17 team came in a 2–1 defeat to Italy in a friendly on 12 July. Brown made nine appearances for England at this level, with his last cap coming in a 4–1 victory over Spain in the 2002 UEFA European Under-17 Championship third place play-off on 10 May 2002. He made his under-18 debut as a 46th-minute substitute in England's 4–0 victory over Tunisia on 14 November. He made two appearances for England at the 2003 Meridian Cup, playing against Burkina Faso and Egypt during February 2003, meaning he was capped three times by England at this level. Brown made his debut for the under-19s on 20 September against Liechtenstein in a 2–0 victory, before scoring his first England goal in the following match two days later, with the fourth goal of a 4–0 victory over Andorra. He went on to be capped seven times at under-19 level, scoring two goals.

== Career statistics ==
Appearances and goals by club, season and competition
Club	Season	League			FA Cup		League Cup		Other		Total	
Club	Season	Division	Apps	Goals	Apps	Goals	Apps	Goals	Apps	Goals	Apps	Goals
Bristol City	2004–05	League One	19	0	1	0	0	0	2 (Note: Appearance(s) in Football League Trophy)	0	22	0
Bristol City	2005–06	League One	29	1	0	0	0	0	1	0	30	1
Bristol City	2006–07	League One	15	4	2	0	1	0	1	0	19	4
Bristol City	Total		63	5	3	0	1	0	4	0	71	5
Cheltenham Town	2006–07	League One	4	0	—		—		—		4	0
Cheltenham Town	2007–08	League One	20	0	0	0	0	0	0	0	20	0
Cheltenham Town	2008–09	League One	0	0	0	0	0	0	1	0	1	0
Cheltenham Town	Total		24	0	0	0	0	0	1	0	25	0
Port Vale	2008–09	League Two	18	1	1	0	—		—		19	1
Cheltenham Town	2009–10	League Two	1	0	—		—		—		1	0
Morecambe	2010–11	League Two	32	3	1	0	0	0	0	0	33	3
Fleetwood Town	2011–12	Conference Premier	9	0	0	0	—		0	0	9	0
York City	2011–12	Conference Premier	7	0	—		—		3 (Note: Two appearances in FA Trophy, one in Conference Premier play-offs)	0	10	0
Macclesfield Town	2012–13	Conference Premier	1	0	—		—		—		1	0
Chester	2012–13	Conference North	22	1	4	0	—		5 (Note: One appearance in FA Trophy, four in Cheshire Senior Cup)	0	31	1
Southport	2013–14	Conference Premier	44	4	2	1	—		1 (Note: Appearance(s) in FA Trophy)	0	47	5
Grimsby Town	2014–15	Conference Premier	33	1	0	0	—		5 (Note: Two appearances in FA Trophy, three in Conference Premier play-offs)	0	38	1
Grimsby Town	2015–16	National League	3	0	1	0	—		2	0	6	0
Grimsby Town	Total		36	1	1	0	—		7	0	44	1
Accrington Stanley	2015–16	League Two	13	3	—		—		2 (Note: Appearances in League Two play-offs)	0	15	3
Accrington Stanley	2016–17	League Two	28	0	3	0	1	0	0	0	32	0
Accrington Stanley	2017–18	League Two	36	1	2	0	2	0	4 (Note: Appearances in EFL Trophy)	1	44	2
Accrington Stanley	2018–19	League One	29	0	3	0	1	0	4	1	37	1
Accrington Stanley	Total		106	4	8	0	4	0	10	2	128	6
Harrogate Town	2019–20	National League	8	0	0	0	—		1	0	9	0
Harrogate Town	2020–21	League Two	0	0	0	0	0	0	0	0	0	0
Harrogate Town	Total		8	0	0	0	0	0	1	0	9	0
Warrington Town (loan)	2019–20	Northern Premier League; Premier Division	12	1	0	0	—		0	0	12	1
Warrington Town (loan)	2020–21	Northern Premier League; Premier Division	5	0	1	0	—		0	0	6	0
Warrington Town (loan)	Total		17	1	1	0	0	0	0	0	18	1
Career total			388	20	21	1	5	0	32	2	446	23

== Honours ==
Everton

- FA Youth Cup runner-up: 2001–02

Bristol City

- Football League One second-place promotion: 2006–07

York City

- Conference Premier play-offs: 2012

Chester

- Conference North: 2012–13
- Cheshire Senior Cup: 2012–13

Accrington Stanley

- EFL League Two: 2017–18

Individual

- Southport Player of the Year: 2013–14
