= Liam Henderson (English footballer) =

English footballer (born 1989)

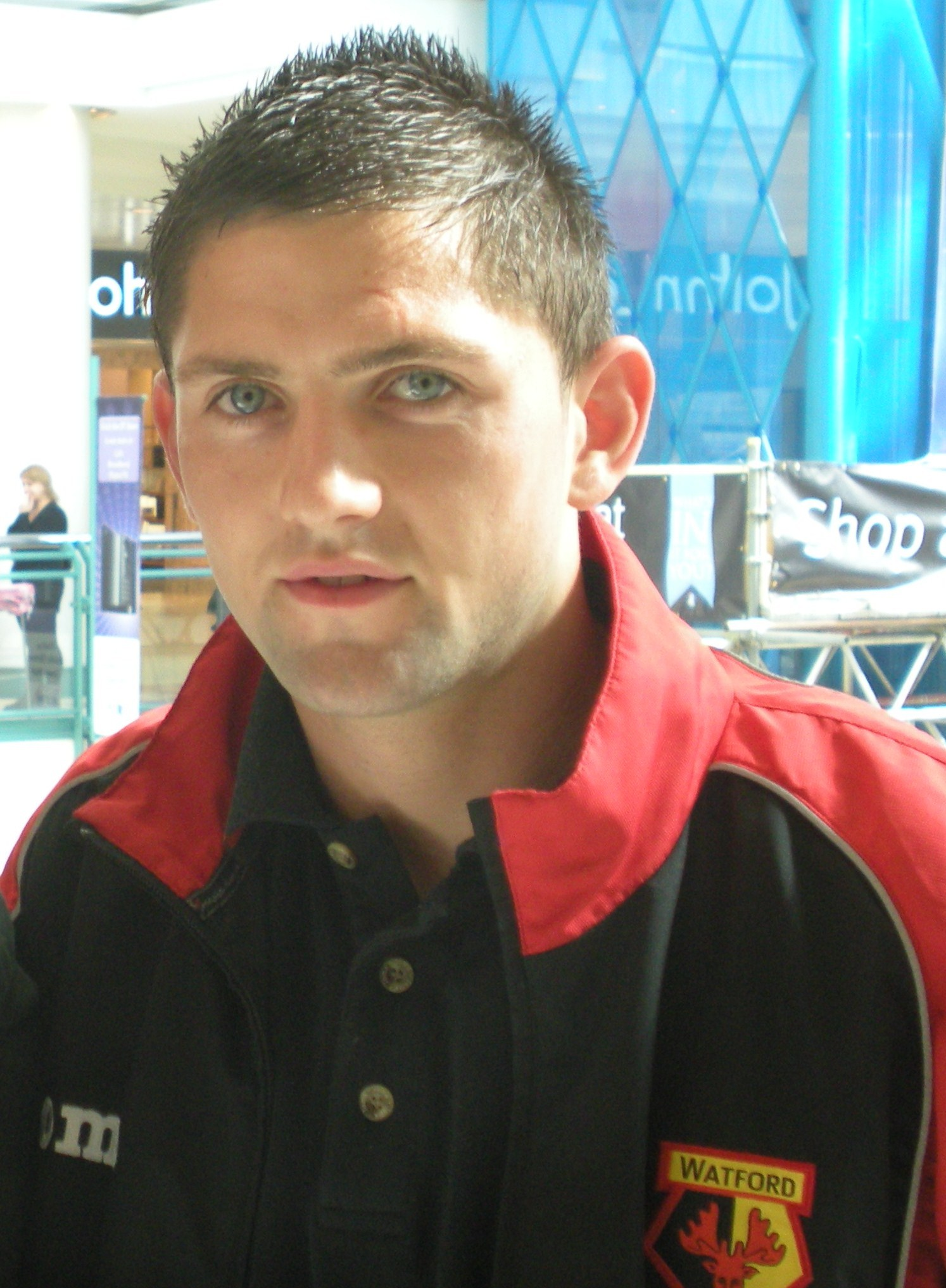
- Henderson in 2010

Personal information
- Full name: Liam Marc Henderson
- Date of birth: 28 December 1989 (age 36)
- Place of birth: Gateshead, England
- Height: 6 ft 1 in (1.85 m)
- Position: Striker

Team information
- Current team: Ashington

Youth career
- Hartlepool United
- 2006–2007: Watford

Senior career*
Years	Team	Apps	(Gls)
2007–2011	Watford	18	(0)
2008	→ Wealdstone (loan)	10	(3)
2009	→ Hartlepool United (loan)	8	(0)
2010–2011	→ Colchester United (loan)	8	(0)
2011	→ Aldershot Town (loan)	1	(0)
2011	→ Rotherham United (loan)	11	(0)
2011–2013	York City	6	(1)
2011	→ Forest Green Rovers (loan)	5	(1)
2012	→ Forest Green Rovers (loan)	17	(1)
2012	→ Gainsborough Trinity (loan)	4	(0)
2012–2013	→ Gateshead (loan)	3	(0)
2013	Gateshead	8	(1)
2013–2016	Spennymoor Town		
2016–2022	Morpeth Town		
2022–2023	Hebburn Town	30	(7)
2023–2024	Bishop Auckland		
2024	Newcastle Blue Star	16	(4)
2024–2025	Blyth Town	11	(1)
2025–	Ashington	13	(0)
- * Club domestic league appearances and goals as of 16:37, 13 September 2025 (UTC)

Liam Marc Henderson (born 28 December 1989) is an English semi-professional footballer who plays as a striker for Northern Premier League Division One East club Ashington.

Henderson started his senior career with Watford and made his first team debut in 2008. He was loaned out by Watford on five occasions, playing for Wealdstone, Hartlepool United, Colchester United, Aldershot Town and Rotherham United. After being released by Watford in 2011 he signed for York City, and in his first season with the club was twice loaned to Forest Green Rovers. He was loaned to Gainsborough Trinity and Gateshead during the 2012–13 season, before signing for Gateshead permanently in 2013.

== Career ==
=== Watford ===
Born in Gateshead, Tyne and Wear, Henderson played in his hometown for Gateshead Redheugh, prior to joining the Hartlepool United youth system. He decided to leave Hartlepool at the age of 14 after eight months as he was being played at centre half and he subsequently rejoined Gateshead Redheugh. He had a trial with West Ham United and was offered a two-year scholarship contract by them and Watford, but decided to sign for Watford at the age of 16 in July 2006. Henderson was first involved with the first team after being an unused substitute for a 2–0 defeat at Southend United in the League Cup second round on 28 August 2007. He joined Isthmian League Premier Division club Wealdstone on work experience for three months in February 2008 and he scored three goals in 10 appearances. He signed a one-year professional contract with Watford in April.

He made his first team debut for Watford in the League Cup second round as a 75th-minute substitute against Darlington in a 2–1 victory after extra time on 26 August. Henderson made his league debut four days later after coming on as a substitute against Ipswich Town in a 2–1 victory. On 15 January 2009, Henderson went on a three-month loan to League One outfit Hartlepool as a replacement for the injured James Brown and the recently departed Richie Barker. He made his debut a day later against Northampton Town as Hartlepool won 2–0, coming on as an 81st-minute substitute for Joel Porter. He went on to make nine appearances for Hartlepool, and had a brief appearance in the FA Cup game against West Ham United, before being recalled by Watford on 25 March. He signed a new one-year contract with Watford in May.

He signed a new one-year contract with Watford in June 2010, with the club having an option to extend it another year. On 14 September Henderson joined League One club Colchester United on loan until early January 2011. After making 11 appearances he returned to Watford after his loan was not renewed by Colchester. After a brief period back at Watford he was sent out on loan to League Two side Aldershot Town on an initial one-month deal on 6 January. Following a change in management at Aldershot, it was decided that Henderson was not going to feature and was sent back to Watford late in January, but he was ineligible to play for another club until the loan expired. He subsequently joined another League Two team, Rotherham United, on a one-month emergency loan on 14 February, and provided an assist on his debut the following, in a 2–0 win against Accrington Stanley. The loan was extended until the end of the season on 17 March.

=== York City and Gateshead ===
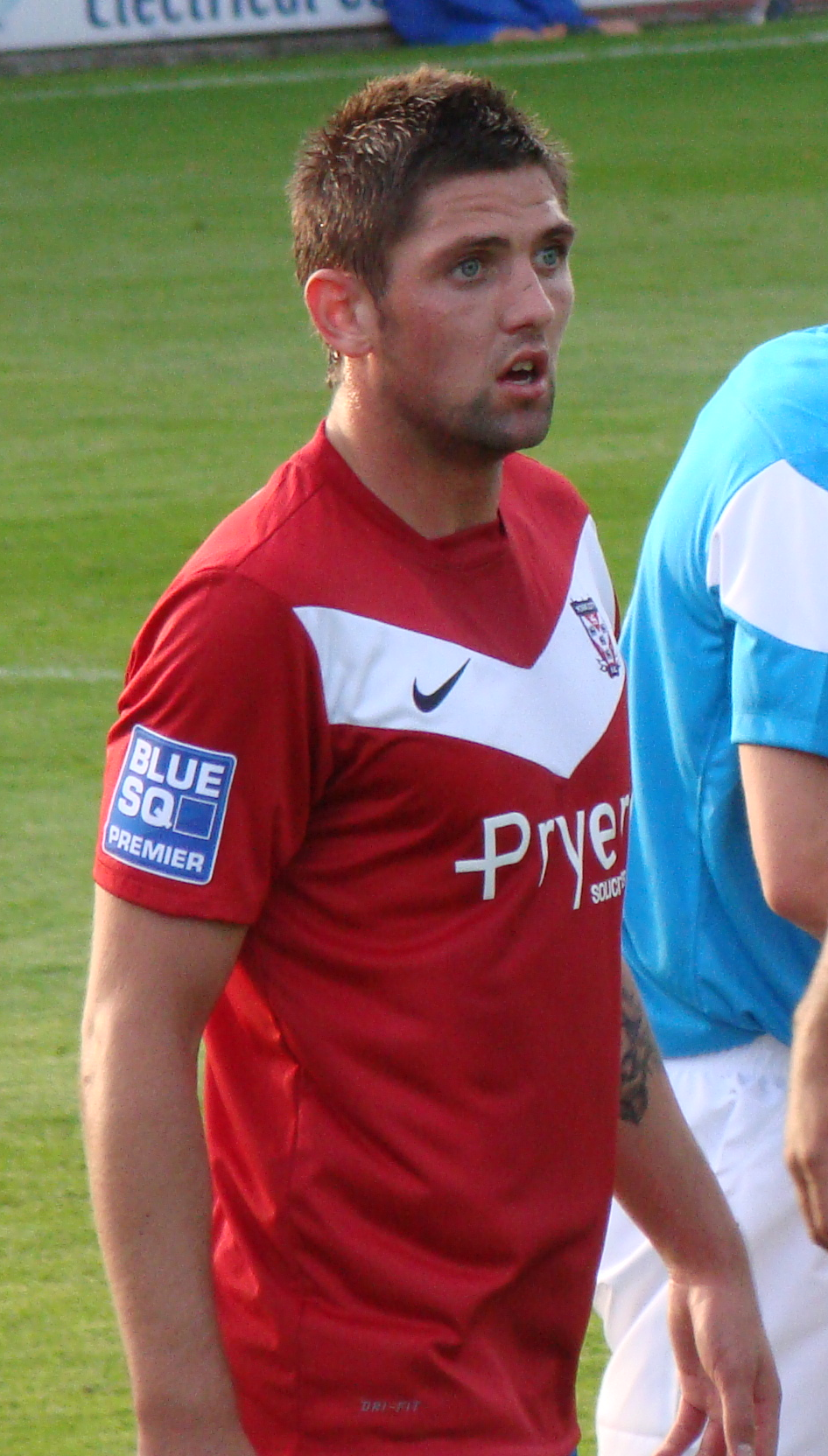
Henderson playing for York City in 2011

Henderson was released by Watford following the end of the 2010–11 season and on 26 May 2011 he signed a two-year contract with Conference Premier club York City on a free transfer. After spending the first two games of the 2011–12 season on the bench for York he suffered a knee injury in training. His debut for York eventually came on 10 September after entering the side's 2–1 defeat away at Tamworth as a 66th-minute substitute. Henderson was signed by fellow Conference Premier side Forest Green Rovers on a one-month loan on 18 November, and scored on his debut the following day with Forest Green's fourth goal of a 5–1 victory away at Braintree Town in the 80th minute, having entered the game three minutes earlier as a 77th-minute substitute. Henderson finished the loan spell with one goal in five appearances. He scored on his full debut for York in a Boxing Day 1–1 draw with Mansfield Town and stated afterwards that he hoped to secure a run in the first team. He eventually returned to Forest Green for a second spell on 6 January 2012, signing on loan until the end of the 2011–12 season. His second period on loan concluded with 1 goal in 17 appearances.

Henderson joined Conference North side Gainsborough Trinity on a one-month loan on 28 September 2012, making his debut the following day in a 2–2 home draw with Corby Town. He made four appearances for Gainsborough before returning to York. On 22 November 2012, he signed for his hometown club, Conference Premier team Gateshead, on loan until 2 January 2013. He made his debut for Gateshead the following day as a 53rd-minute substitute in a 2–0 win against Macclesfield Town in the FA Trophy. After making four appearances for Gateshead, he signed for the club permanently on a contract until the end of the 2012–13 season, after he agreed a settlement with York over his contract.3 Henderson scored his first goal for Gateshead on 20 April 2013, the final day of the 2012–13 Conference Premier season, in a 2–0 win over Ebbsfleet United. Six days later, Hendseron was one of seven players released by Gateshead.

=== Non-League ===
Henderson dropped down to play in the Northern League Division One after signing for Spennymoor Town on 21 June 2013. At the end of his first season (2013–14) with the club, he was Spennymoor's top striker for that season, scoring 37 goals.

Henderson joined Morpeth Town in June 2016.

In November 2024, Henderson joined Blyth Town following a spell with Newcastle Blue Star.

In March 2025, he joined Ashington.

== Career statistics ==
As of match played 20 April 2013.

Appearances and goals by club, season and competition
Club	Season	League			FA Cup		League Cup		Other		Total	
Club	Season	Division	Apps	Goals	Apps	Goals	Apps	Goals	Apps	Goals	Apps	Goals
Watford	2007–08	Championship	0	0	0	0	0	0	0	0	0	0
Watford	2008–09	Championship	5	0	0	0	1	0	—		6	0
Watford	2009–10	Championship	13	0	1	0	1	0	—		15	0
Watford	2010–11	Championship	0	0	0	0	0	0	—		0	0
Watford	Total		18	0	1	0	2	0	0	0	21	0
Wealdstone (loan)	2007–08	Isthmian League Premier Division	10	3	0	0	—		0	0	10	3
Hartlepool United (loan)	2008–09	League One	8	0	1	0	0	0	0	0	9	0
Colchester United (loan)	2010–11	League One	8	0	2	0	0	0	1 (Note: Appearance in Football League Trophy)	0	11	0
Aldershot Town (loan)	2010–11	League Two	1	0	0	0	0	0	0	0	1	0
Rotherham United (loan)	2010–11	League Two	11	0	0	0	0	0	0	0	11	0
York City	2011–12	Conference Premier	6	1	1	0	—		0	0	7	1
York City	2012–13	League Two	0	0	0	0	0	0	0	0	0	0
York City	Total		6	1	1	0	0	0	0	0	7	1
Forest Green Rovers (loan)	2011–12	Conference Premier	22	2	0	0	—		0	0	22	2
Gainsborough Trinity (loan)	2012–13	Conference North	4	0	0	0	—		0	0	4	0
Gateshead (loan)	2012–13	Conference Premier	3	0	0	0	—		1 (Note: Appearance in FA Trophy)	0	4	0
Gateshead	2012–13	Conference Premier	8	1	0	0	—		1	0	9	1
Gateshead	Total		11	1	0	0	0	0	2	0	13	1
Career total			99	7	5	0	2	0	3	0	109	7
