= Jamie Reed (footballer) =

Welsh association football player

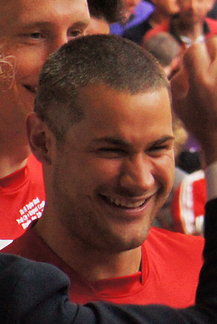
- Reed with York City following the 2012 FA Trophy Final

Personal information
- Full name: Jamie Lee Reed
- Date of birth: 13 August 1987 (age 39)
- Place of birth: Chester, England
- Height: 6 ft 0 in (1.83 m)
- Position: Striker

Team information
- Current team: South Melbourne (head coach)

Youth career
- 2003–2005: Wrexham

Senior career*
Years	Team	Apps	(Gls)
2005–2008	Wrexham	7	(1)
2006	→ Glentoran (loan)	5	(1)
2006–2007	→ Colwyn Bay (loan)	5	(4)
2007–2008	→ Aberystwyth Town (loan)	20	(9)
2008	→ Tamworth (loan)	7	(1)
2008–2009	Rhyl	31	(13)
2009–2011	Bangor City	52	(49)
2010	→ Dandenong Thunder (loan)	7	(5)
2011–2013	York City	74	(25)
2013	→ Cambridge United (loan)	7	(1)
2013–2014	Chester	22	(2)
2014	South Melbourne	25	(12)
2015–2016	The New Saints	9	(4)
2015–2016	→ Aberystwyth Town (loan)	17	(7)
2016	Llandudno	5	(3)
2016–2017	Bangor City	20	(2)
2017	Llandudno	10	(2)
2017	Newtown	24	(10)
2017–2018	Ashton United	2	(1)
2019	Northwich Victoria	14	(11)
2020	Cefn Druids	14	(8)
2021	Aberystwyth Town	8	(5)
2021	Prestatyn Town	14	(10)
2021–2022	1874 Northwich	20	(10)
2023	Wythenshawe Town	1	(0)
2023–2024	Mold Alexandra	2	(0)
2024	Buckley Town	6	(3)
2024–2025	Connah's Quay Town	15	(7)
2025	Ruthin Town	8	(1)
2025–2026	Bangor City 1876	27	(12)
2026	Holywell Town	10	(0)
Total		488	(219)

International career
2009–2012	Wales semi-pro	4	(0)

Managerial career
- 2022–2023: Airbus UK Broughton
- 2026–: South Melbourne
- * Club domestic league appearances and goals as of 05:46, 10 October 2026 (UTC)

Jamie Lee Reed (born 13 August 1987) is a football player and coach who plays as a striker. He is currently head coach at South Melbourne. Born in England, he has represented Wales at semi-professional level.

== Club career ==
=== Early career ===
Born in Chester, Cheshire, Reed began his career in Wrexham's youth system aged 16 in 2003. He signed his first professional contract with the club on 20 August 2004. He made his first-team debut as a 79th minute substitute in a 4–1 defeat at Wycombe Wanderers on 27 September 2005. He joined Glentoran on loan until the end of the 2005–06 season in January 2006 and made five appearances for the Irish Premier League side. After returning to Wrexham, manager Denis Smith said "While it was not easy for him with a change of manager so early in his spell at Glentoran, he knuckled down" and in June 2006 signed his professional contract with the club. Reed joined Northern Premier League First Division team Colwyn Bay on an initial one-month on 28 October 2006, making his debut the following day in a 1–0 victory over Alsager Town. His first goal for the club came against Goole in November 2006, and having scored four goals in five appearances he returned to Wrexham on 1 January 2007.

In August 2007, Reed signed for Welsh Premier League club Aberystwyth Town on a four-month loan until January 2008. He finished the loan with 9 goals from 20 league appearances and joined Conference North team Tamworth on a one-month loan in January 2008. He made his debut in a 1–0 victory at Blyth Spartans in the FA Trophy second round on 12 January 2008, and his first goal came in a 2–1 victory over Hyde United on 26 January. He extended the loan on 12 February 2008 for second month until March 2008. Reed returned to Wrexham on 12 March 2008 after the completion of a two-month loan, which he completed with 11 appearances and 1 goal.

=== Welsh Premier League ===
Wrexham released Reed on 6 May 2008 following the club's relegation into the Conference Premier, and after a trial with The New Saints he joined Welsh Premier League side Rhyl one a one-year contract on 1 July. He scored 13 times in 31 league appearances as Rhyl won the Welsh Premier League title, before leaving at the end of 2008–09. After an attempt to win a contract at a Major League Soccer club in the United States, Reed decided to sign for Bangor City in August 2009. He was named Welsh Premier League Player of the Month for March 2010, having scored seven goals in six matches, at the time placing him as the league's top goalscorer. He scored the second goal in the 2010 Welsh Cup Final against Port Talbot Town on 1 May, which Bangor went on to win 3–2. Reed finished 2009–10 with 30 goals in 42 appearances, finishing second to Rhys Griffiths in the Welsh Premier League goalscoring charts with 24 goals. Reed joined Australian Victorian Premier League side Dandenong Thunder in May on loan for the duration of the summer break in the Welsh Premier League, scoring five goals in seven appearances before returning to Bangor in August. He signed a new contract with Bangor in September 2010, which contracted him to the club until June 2013.

=== York City ===
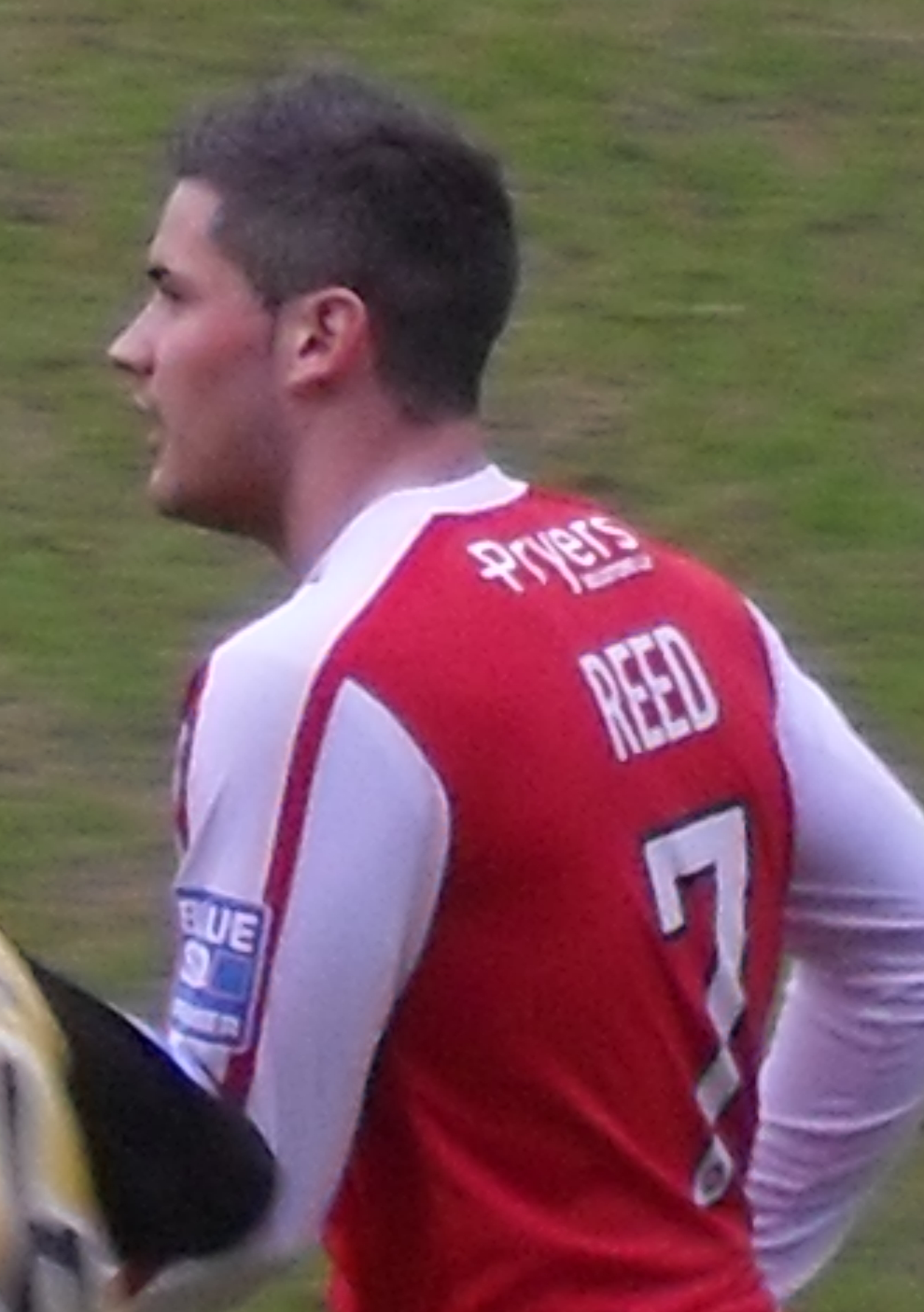
Reed playing for York City in 2011

In November 2010, Conference Premier side York City had a five-figure bid for Reed rejected by Bangor. He signed for York on 6 January 2011 for an undisclosed fee, which set a new record for the highest fee received by Bangor, on a two-and-a-half-year contract. Prior to signing for York, he had scored 18 goals in 19 appearances for Bangor during 2010–11, with 17 league goals making him the top scorer in the Welsh Premier League. Reed made his debut as an 85th-minute substitute in a 2–0 defeat away to Premier League club Bolton Wanderers in the FA Cup third round on 8 January 2011. This was followed by his first start and home debut three days later in a 1–0 victory over Grimsby Town on 11 January 2011. He scored his first goal after latching onto Ashley Chambers' rebounded shot in a 2–1 home win over Forest Green Rovers on 22 January 2011. He scored two goals in one game for the first time for York with both goals in a 2–1 victory over Mansfield Town on 15 March 2011. Reed finished 2010–11 with 9 goals in 24 appearances for York.

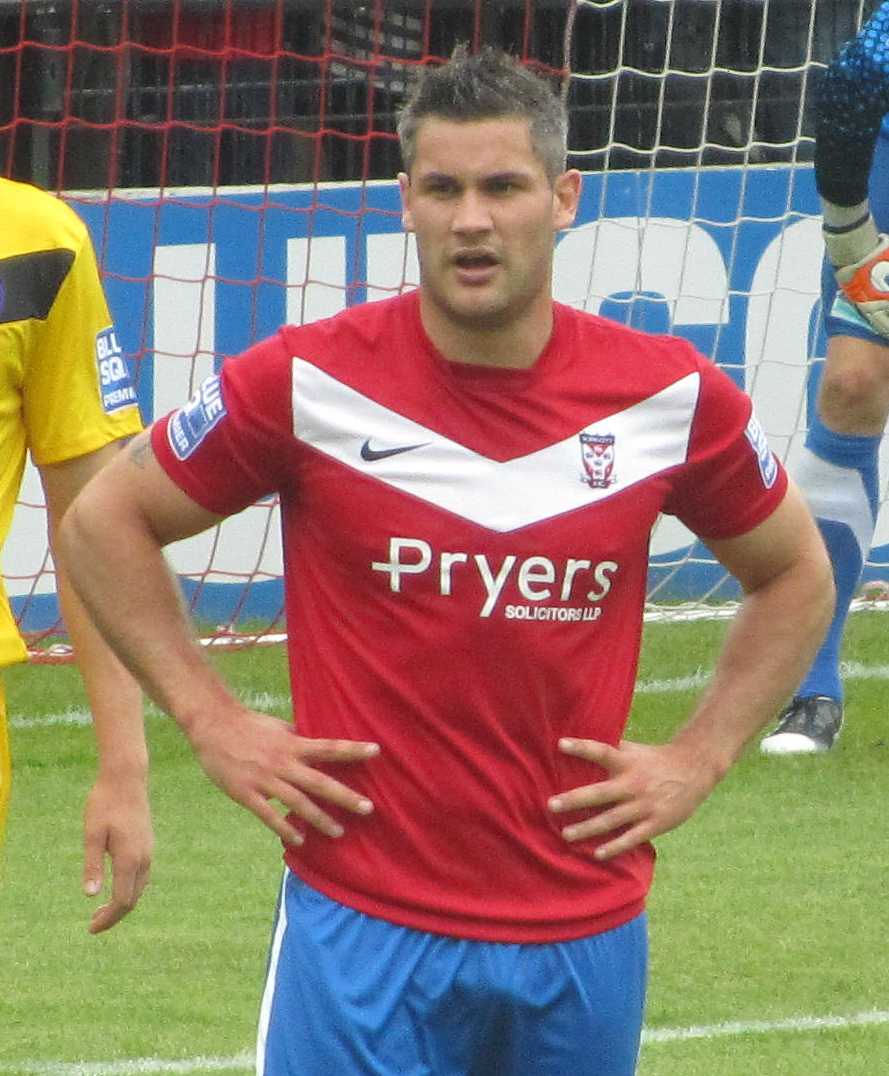
Reed playing for York City in 2011

On his sixth appearance of 2011–12, all of which were as a substitute, Reed scored an 88th-minute winner with a volley in a 1–0 home victory over Bath City on 13 September 2011. Reed entered the 2012 FA Trophy Final as a 90th-minute substitute, with York beating Newport County 2–0 at Wembley Stadium on 12 May 2012. Eight days later he entered the 2–1 win over Luton in the 2012 Conference Premier play-off final at Wembley as a 78th-minute substitute, a result that meant the club returned to the Football League after an eight-year absence with promotion to League Two.

Reed scored his first goal of 2012–13 with the opening goal of a 1–1 home draw with AFC Wimbledon in the FA Cup first round on 3 November 2012. He was loaned to Conference Premier side Cambridge United for the rest of the season on 11 February 2013. He made his debut the following day in Cambridge's 3–0 home defeat to Alfreton Town. He was recalled early from the loan by York on 11 March 2013, having made seven appearances for Cambridge. Reed made 3 substitute outings after returning, meaning he finished the season with 19 appearances and 4 goals for York. He was released by York on 30 April 2013.

=== Chester and South Melbourne ===
Reed signed for his hometown club, newly promoted Conference Premier side Chester, on a one-year contract on 4 July 2013. He signed for South Melbourne of the National Premier Leagues Victoria in Australia on 12 March 2014.

=== Later career ===
Reed signed for The New Saints on 7 November 2014 despite not being able to play until January 2015. He scored his first goal for the club as a half time substitute against Prestatyn Town. He left the club by mutual consent on 29 January 2016 and signed for their Welsh Premier League rivals Llandudno later that day. Subsequently, he joined Newtown. In January 2019, following an achilles rupture, he joined Ashton United. A spell with Northwich Victoria followed.

In 2020 he joined Cefn Druids before moving to Aberystwyth Town in early 2021. He then joined Prestatyn Town, in the second tier Cymru North in May 2021, where as well as playing he manages the club's Under-19 side. In late 2021, Reed joined Northern Premier League Division One West side 1874 Northwich. He made his debut off the bench in a 3–1 win at Kidsgrove Athletic, where he scored the third goal. At the beginning of the 2022-23 preseason, 1874 Northwich announced Reed as a player-coach for the upcoming season. On the 12th April 2025 he scored the only goal in a Ruthin Town 1-0 victory over former club Bangor played at Bala. That victory kept Ruthin in tier two and relegated Bangor.

He joined Bangor City 1876 for the 2025–26 season, a season which saw the club promoted as Ardal NW champions and winning the FAW Trophy and him score 19 goals across all competitions. After scoring with his final touch in the penultimate league game of the season, he announced his retirement from playing with immediate effect at the age of 38.

In July 2026 he came out of retirement to sign for newly promoted Cymru Premier side Holywell Town but in late October 2026 it was announced that he would return to one of his former clubs, South Melbourne as head coach.

== International career ==
In November 2009, Reed made his debut for the Wales semi-pro team in a 2–2 draw with Northern Ireland, which made him the second player to feature for a Welsh national team under the "education eligibility" ruling.

== Personal life ==
Reed was living in Chester with his parents until joining York City, when he and his partner moved to a house in York. He is the older brother of professional footballer turned reality TV star Scott van-der-Sluis, who appeared on Love Island, Love Island USA, and Love Island Games.

== Career statistics ==
As of match played 15 January 2022.

Appearances and goals by club, season and competition
Club	Season	League			National Cup		League Cup		Other		Total	
Club	Season	Division	Apps	Goals	Apps	Goals	Apps	Goals	Apps	Goals	Apps	Goals
Wrexham	2005–06	League Two	3	0	0	0	0	0	0	0	3	0
Wrexham	2006–07	League Two	4	0	0	0	0	0	0	0	4	0
Wrexham	2007–08	League Two	0	0	—		—		—		0	0
Wrexham	Total		7	0	0	0	0	0	0	0	7	0
Glentoran (loan)	2005–06	Irish Premier League	5	0	—		—		—		5	0
Colwyn Bay (loan)	2006–07	NPL First Division	5	4	—		—		—		5	4
Aberystwyth Town (loan)	2007–08	Welsh Premier League	20	9					—		20	9
Tamworth (loan)	2007–08	Conference North	7	1	—		—		4 (Note: Appearance(s) in FA Trophy)	0	11	1
Rhyl	2008–09	Welsh Premier League	31	13					—		31	13
Bangor City	2009–10	Welsh Premier League	34	24	6	6	2	0	—		42	30
Bangor City	2010–11	Welsh Premier League	18	17	1	1	0	0	—		19	18
Bangor City	Total		52	41	7	7	2	0	—		61	48
Dandenong Thunder (loan)	2010	Victorian Premier League	7	5	—		—		—		7	5
York City	2010–11	Conference Premier	23	9	1	0	—		—		24	9
York City	2011–12	Conference Premier	35	10	1	0	—		6 (Note: Five appearances and two goals in FA Trophy, one appearance in Conference Premier play-offs)	2	42	12
York City	2012–13	League Two	16	1	2	3	0	0	1 (Note: Appearance in Football League Trophy)	0	19	4
York City	Total		74	20	4	3	0	0	7	2	85	25
Cambridge United (loan)	2012–13	Conference Premier	7	0	—		—		—		7	0
Chester	2013–14	Conference Premier	22	2	1	0	—		3 (Note: One appearance in FA Trophy, two appearances and one goal in Cheshire Senior Cup)	1	26	3
South Melbourne	2014	National Premier Leagues Victoria	25	12	—		—		6 (Note: Two appearances and one goal in National Premier League Finals, four appearances in Dockerty Cup)	1	31	13
The New Saints	2014–15	Welsh Premier League	9	4	1	0	1	0	—		11	4
The New Saints	2015–16	Welsh Premier League	0	0	0	0	0	0	—		0	0
The New Saints	Total		9	4	1	0	1	0	—		11	4
Aberystwyth Town (loan)	2015–16	Welsh Premier League	17	7	0	0	0	0	—		17	7
Llandudno	2015–16	Welsh Premier League	5	3	—		—		—		5	3
Bangor City	2016–17	Welsh Premier League	20	2	1	0	2	0	0	0	23	2
Llandudno	2016–17	Welsh Premier League	0	0	0	0	0	0	0	0	0	0
1874 Northwich	2021–22	Northern Premier League Division One West	9	5	0	0	0	0	1 (Note: Appearance in 2021-22 Cheshire Senior Cup)	0	9	5
Career total			324	128	13	10	5	0	21	4	352	151

== Honours ==
Rhyl

- Welsh Premier League: 2008–09

Bangor City

- Welsh Cup: 2009–10
- Welsh Premier League: 2010–11

York City

- Conference Premier play-offs: 2011–12
- FA Trophy: 2011–12

South Melbourne

- National Premier Leagues Victoria: 2014

The New Saints

- Welsh Premier League: 2014–15
- Welsh Cup: 2014–15
- Welsh League Cup: 2014–15

Bangor City 1876

- Ardal NW: 2025–26
- FAW Trophy: 2025–26
