= Jason Walker (footballer) =

English footballer (born 1984)

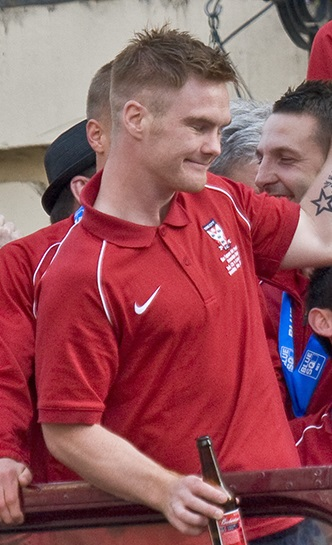
- Walker with the parade that followed York City's victory in the 2012 Conference Premier play-off final

Personal information
- Full name: Jason Walker
- Date of birth: 21 March 1984 (age 42)
- Place of birth: Barrow-in-Furness, England
- Height: 5 ft 9 in (1.75 m)
- Position: Striker

Team information
- Current team: Kendal Town (assistant manager)

Youth career
- 2000–2004: Dundee

Senior career*
Years	Team	Apps	(Gls)
2004–2007	Greenock Morton	75	(12)
2007	Morecambe	5	(0)
2007–2011	Barrow	140	(46)
2010–2011	→ Luton Town (loan)	3	(1)
2011	Luton Town	17	(3)
2011–2013	York City	73	(27)
2013	Östersund	11	(1)
2014	Forest Green Rovers	3	(0)
2014	→ Southport (loan)	10	(6)
2014–2016	Barrow	74	(27)
2016–2018	Chorley	55	(17)
2018–2019	Workington	41	(12)
2019–2020	Lancaster City	5	(1)
2022–2024	Holker Old Boys		
2025–	Kendal Town	24	(4)

International career
2009	England C	1	(0)
- * Club domestic league appearances and goals as of 10:20, 20 May 2026 (UTC)

Jason Walker (born 21 March 1984) is an English semi-professional footballer who plays as a striker for Northern League Division One club Kendal Town, where he holds the role of assistant manager.

He previously played for Dundee, Greenock Morton, Morecambe, Luton Town, York City, Östersund, Forest Green Rovers, Southport, Barrow, Chorley and Workington.

== Club career ==
=== Early career ===
Born in Barrow-in-Furness, Cumbria, Walker grew in Flookburgh and attended Cartmel Priory School. He was playing for Cartmel in the North Lancashire and District Football League at the age of 16 when he was spotted by a Dundee scout. He signed for the Scottish Premier League team's youth system on a two-year scholarship straight from school after playing three games on trial. He then had two years on a professional contract before being released in May 2004 with the club in administration, bringing to an end four years with Dundee. He subsequently joined Scottish Second Division side Greenock Morton in July 2004. He left the club and signed for Conference National side Morecambe in January 2007 after training with the team. He scored in the 90th minute on his first team debut, a 5–0 victory at home to Mangotsfield United in the FA Trophy second round on 13 January 2007, after entering the match as a 65th minute substitute. Following the game, manager Sammy McIlroy said "Jason took his goal really well. He could be a good asset for us".

=== Barrow ===
Walker was released by Morecambe on 8 March 2007 and one day later signed for Conference North side Barrow. He scored 13 goals in 48 games in the 2007–08 season as Barrow won promotion to the Conference Premier via the Conference North play-offs. In the 2008–09 season he was Barrow's top scorer with 12 goals in the league, and scored Barrow's goal in their 2–1 defeat by Middlesbrough in the FA Cup third round.

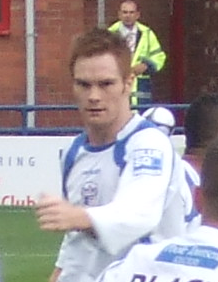
Walker playing for Barrow in 2008

Walker was allowed to go on trial with Championship side Doncaster Rovers in July 2009, having impressed their manager Sean O'Driscoll in a pre-season friendly against his side. However, despite Walker scoring in two trial games, Doncaster did not follow up their interest and he returned to Barrow for the 2009–10 season.

On 20 March 2010, Walker scored twice as Barrow beat Salisbury City 2–1 in the second leg of the FA Trophy semi-final, which gave Barrow a 3–1 win on aggregate and therefore progression to the Final at Wembley Stadium. Barrow faced Conference Premier champions Stevenage Borough in the Final on 8 May 2010 and Walker scored the winning goal with a 25-yard "wonder strike" in a 2–1 victory after extra time.

=== Luton Town ===
Walker signed for fellow Conference Premier side Luton Town on 17 November 2010, initially on loan, with a view to a permanent transfer in January 2011. He scored on his Luton debut with a header from Matthew Barnes-Homer's cross and earlier in the match assisted a Jake Howells goal in a 5–1 win at home to Histon on 20 November 2010.

The permanent switch for an undisclosed fee, believed to be around £45,000, was completed on 5 January 2011, with Walker signing a one-and-a-half-year contract. His final act as a Luton player was to miss a crucial penalty kick in the 2011 Conference Premier play-off final penalty shoot-out defeat to AFC Wimbledon at the City of Manchester Stadium on 21 May 2011, with his chipped effort being saved by goalkeeper Seb Brown. He finished the season with six goals in 29 appearances for Luton.

=== York City ===
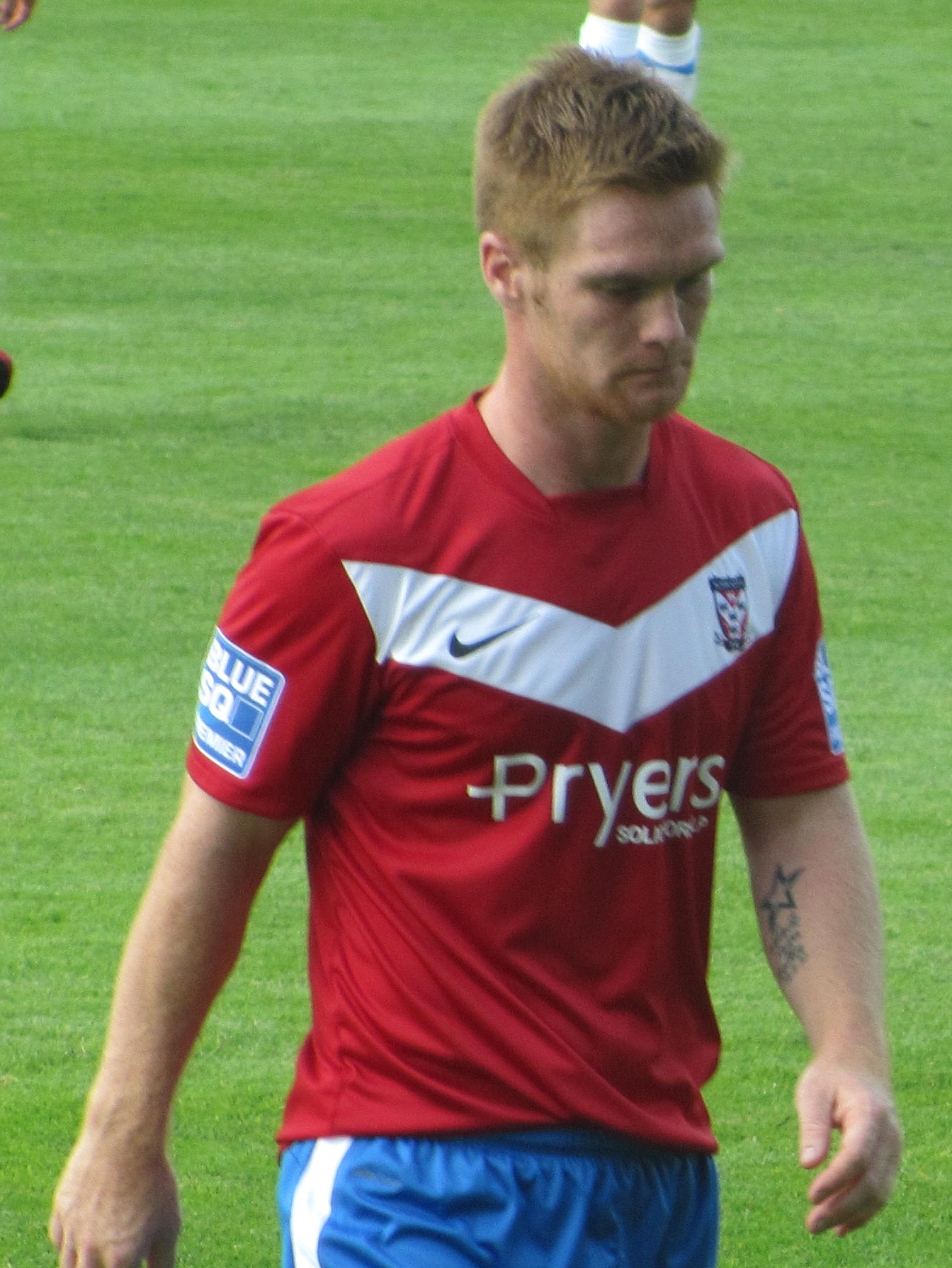
Walker playing for York City in 2011

Eight months after joining Luton, Walker signed for Conference Premier rivals York City on a two-year contract on 16 June 2011, with the officially undisclosed fee being revealed by Luton as £60,000. He scored a penalty and a 90th minute winning goal with a header on his debut, a 2–1 victory away at Ebbsfleet United in the opening game of the 2011–12 season on 13 August 2011. Walker was handed a three-match suspension after being red carded during a 0–0 draw away at former club Barrow on 19 November 2011 for a tackle on Jason Owen during stoppage time. Walker won a second FA Trophy in the 2012 Final with York at Wembley on 12 May 2012, in which the side beat Newport County 2–0. Eight days later he played in the 2–1 victory over his former club Luton in the 2012 Conference Premier play-off final at Wembley, seeing York return to the Football League after an eight-year absence with promotion to League Two.

Walker started York's game away at League One Doncaster Rovers in the League Cup first round in the opening game of the 2012–13 season on 11 August 2012, which the side lost 4–2 in a penalty shoot-out following a 1–1 draw after extra time. After converting Jonathan Smith's header, his first goal of the season came in the following game, a 3–1 defeat at home to Wycombe Wanderers on 18 August 2012, which was York's first Football League fixture since their promotion. He completed the season having scored nine goals in 48 games before being released by York on 29 April 2013.

=== Östersunds FK ===
Walker signed for Swedish Superettan side Östersund on 1 July 2013 and made his debut in a 2–0 away defeat to Falkenbergs FF on 20 July.

=== Forest Green Rovers ===
Walker joined Forest Green Rovers in the Conference Premier on 22 January 2014, signing a contract until the end of the 2013–14 season. He made his debut for the club on 25 January 2014, coming on as a substitute for Lee Hughes on 86 minutes in a 3–0 home win against Chester. After making two appearances for Forest Green, Walker signed for Conference Premier rivals Southport on 27 February 2014, on a loan deal until 26 March. He scored on his debut, in a 3–0 home win over Dartford on 1 March 2013. On 24 March 2014, it was announced that Walker had extended his loan with Southport until the end of the season. After scoring 6 times in 10 appearances for Southport, he was recalled by Forest Green on 20 April 2014 after an injury crisis at the club. On 28 April 2014, it was announced that he had been released by Forest Green.

=== Return to Barrow ===
Walker rejoined Barrow on a three-year contract on 19 May 2014, with the club by this time playing in the Conference North. Walker was part of the Barrow team who won the Conference North title in the 2014–15 season by beating Lowestoft 3–2 on the final day of the season.

=== Chorley ===
Upon his release by Barrow Walker signed for National League North side Chorley.

=== Lancaster City ===
In May 2019, Walker joined Northern Premier League Premier Division club Lancaster City.

== International career ==
Walker became the first Barrow player since the early 1990s to earn a call-up to the England C team after being included in the squad to face the Malta under-21 team in February 2009. He started the game alongside Barrow teammate Paul Brown, with England winning the match 4–0, although he was substituted at half time for Adam Boyes.

== Coaching career ==
In May 2026, having joined as player-coach the previous summer, he was appointed assistant manager of Northern League Division One club Kendal Town.

== Career statistics ==
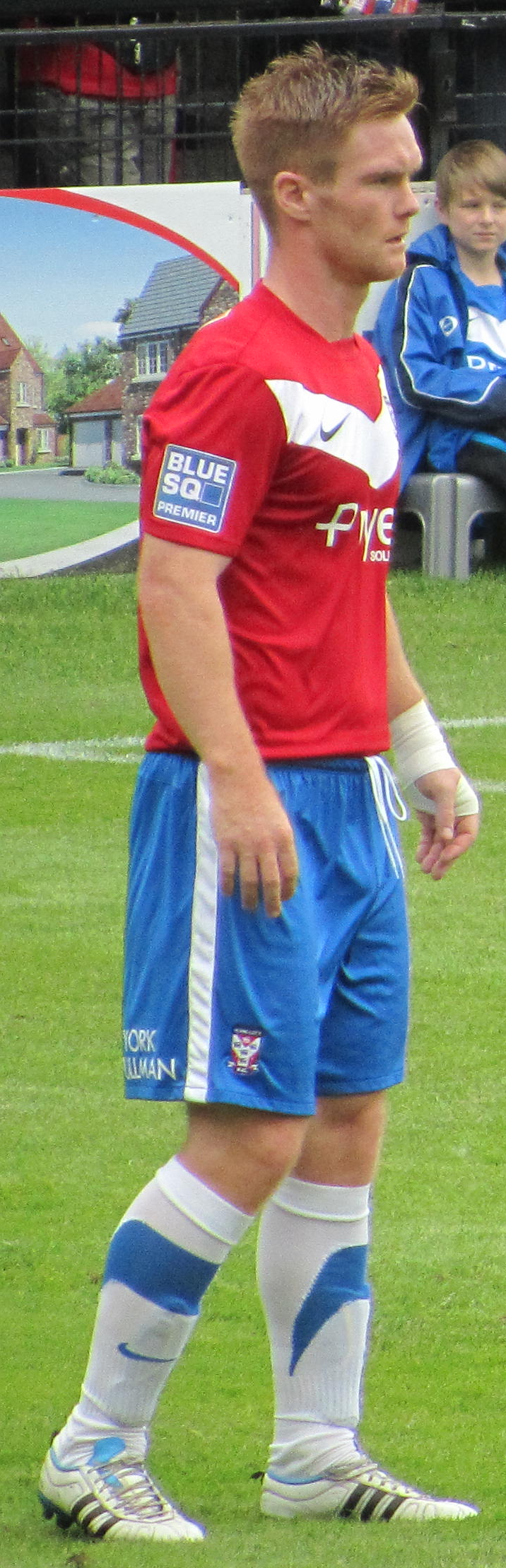
Walker playing for York City in 2011

As of match played 26 December 2017

Appearances and goals by club, season and competition
Club	Season	League			National Cup		League Cup		Other		Total	
Club	Season	Division	Apps	Goals	Apps	Goals	Apps	Goals	Apps	Goals	Apps	Goals
Greenock Morton	2004–05	Scottish Second Division	27	7	3	2	2	0	1 (Note: Appearance(s) in Scottish Challenge Cup)	0	33	9
Greenock Morton	2005–06	Scottish Second Division	35	5	2	1	1	0	5	2	43	8
Greenock Morton	2006–07	Scottish Second Division	13	0	1	0	0	0	2	0	16	0
Greenock Morton	Total		75	12	6	3	3	0	8	2	92	17
Morecambe	2006–07	Conference National	5	0	—		—		2 (Note: Appearances in FA Trophy)	1	7	1
Barrow	2006–07	Conference North	8	0	—		—		—		8	0
Barrow	2007–08	Conference North	37	9	3	1	—		8 (Note: Four appearances and three goals in Conference League Cup, one appearance in FA Trophy, three appearances in Conference North play-offs)	3	48	13
Barrow	2008–09	Conference Premier	41	12	5	1	—		5 (Note: Three appearances and four goals in Conference League Cup, two appearances and one goal in FA Trophy)	5	51	18
Barrow	2009–10	Conference Premier	36	14	5	2	—		8	6	49	22
Barrow	2010–11	Conference Premier	18	11	1	0	—		—		19	11
Barrow	Total		140	46	14	4	—		21	14	175	64
Luton Town	2010–11	Conference Premier	20	4	—		—		9 (Note: Six appearances and one goal in FA Trophy, three appearances and one goal in Conference Premier play-offs)	2	29	6
York City	2011–12	Conference Premier	30	18	0	0	—		9 (Note: Six appearances in FA Trophy, three in Conference Premier play-offs)	0	39	18
York City	2012–13	League Two	43	9	2	0	1	0	2 (Note: Appearances in Football League Trophy)	0	48	9
York City	Total		73	27	2	0	1	0	11	0	87	27
Östersund	2013	Superettan	11	1	1	1	—		—		12	2
Forest Green Rovers	2013–14	Conference Premier	3	0	—		—		—		3	0
Southport (loan)	2013–14	Conference Premier	10	6	—		—		—		10	6
Barrow	2014–15	Conference North	40	16	1	0	—		0	0	41	16
Barrow	2015–16	National League	34	11	0	0	—		2	0	36	11
Barrow	Total		74	27	1	0	—		2	0	77	27
Chorley	2016–17	National League North	36	14	0	0	—		1	0	37	14
Chorley	2017–18	National League North	19	3	1	0	—		3	0	23	3
Chorley	Total		55	17	1	0	—		4	0	60	17
Career total			466	140	25	8	4	0	57	19	552	167

== Honours ==
Barrow

- Conference North play-offs: 2008
- FA Trophy: 2009–10

York City

- Conference Premier play-offs: 2012
- FA Trophy: 2011–12
