= Marc Limbert =

Welsh footballer

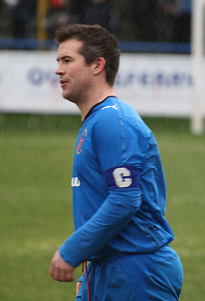

Personal information
- Date of birth: 3 October 1973 (age 53)
- Place of birth: Mancot, Wales
- Position: Midfielder

Youth career
- Everton

Senior career*
Years	Team	Apps	(Gls)
1992–1994	Chester City	14	(?)
1994–1997	Connah's Quay Nomads		
1997	Altrincham		
1997–2003	Colwyn Bay		
2003	TNS		
2003–2006	Rhyl		
2006–2007	Connah's Quay Nomads	29	(9)
2007–2010	Bangor City	47	(3)
- * Club domestic league appearances and goals as of 1 December 2008

Marc Limbert (born 3 October 1973, Mancot) is a retired Welsh football midfielder.

Limbert began his career as a trainee with Everton, but was released without making the first team. He joined Chester City, where he was to gain experience in The Football League by playing 14 league games in the 1992–93 season.

On leaving Chester a year later he joined Connah's Quay Nomads and played for Altrincham, leaving to join Colwyn Bay in July 1997. He subsequently had a brief spell with TNS before joining Rhyl in May 2003, having played on dual terms for Rhyl at the latter end of the previous season.

He re-joined Connah's Quay Nomads in 2006 but stayed for just the one season, following manager Neville Powell to Bangor City in June 2007. He was immediately made by captain at Farrar Road, and lifted the Welsh Cup in May 2008, scoring a penalty in extra-time in a 4–2 win against Llanelli AFC at Newtown's Latham Park. He captained the team in their 10-0 aggregate loss against Danish team FC Midtjylland in the UEFA Cup Preliminary First Round.

Marc is currently the assistant manager at Bangor, his first team appearances now only tending to come in the league cup.

== Honours ==
- Welsh Premier League Team of the Year: 2003–04
