= 2012 Conference Premier play-off final =

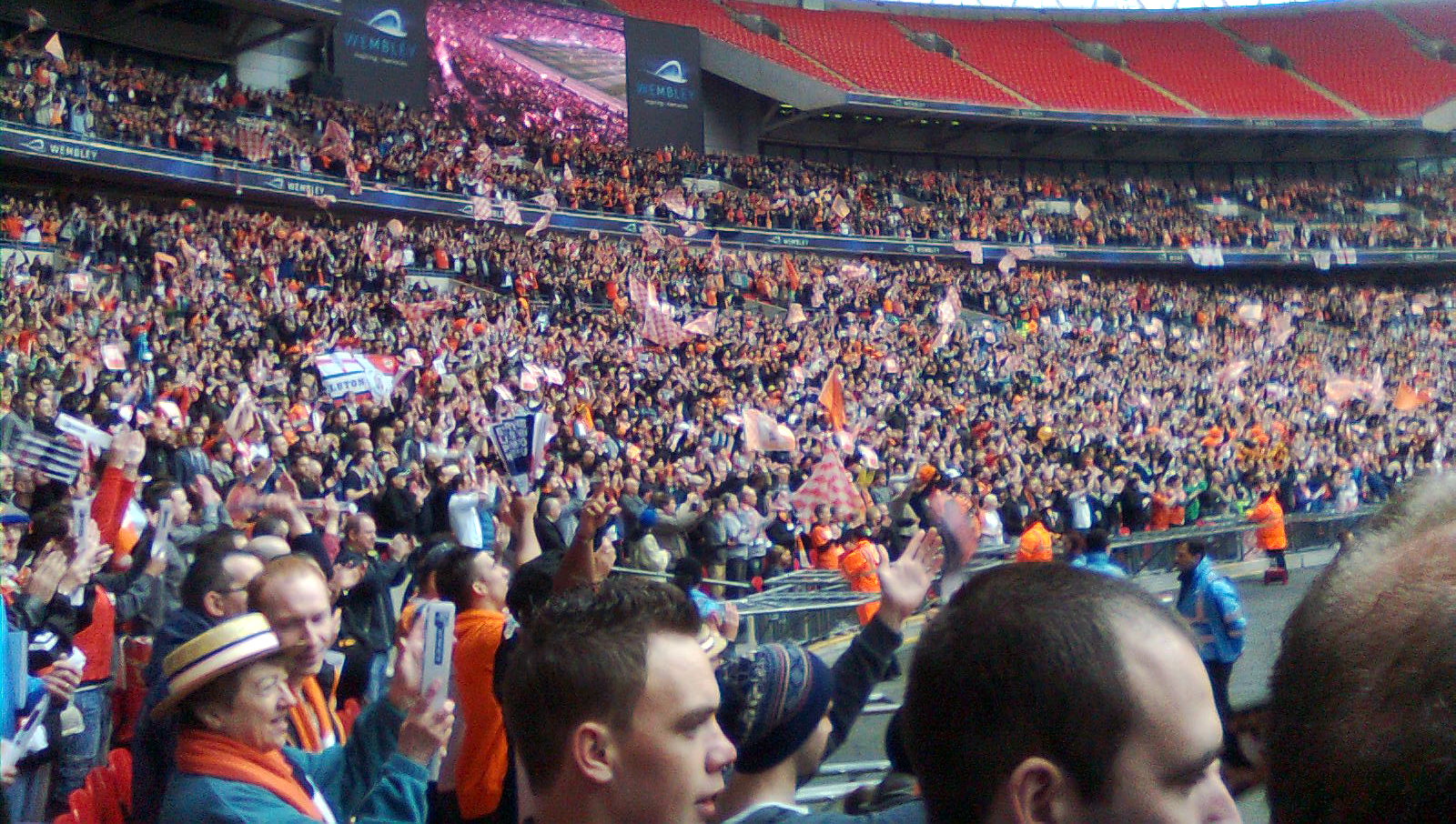
- Luton supporters at the match
- Event: 2011–12 Football Conference
Luton Town	York City
1	2
- Date: 20 May 2012
- Venue: Wembley Stadium, London
- Referee: Jeremy Simpson
- Attendance: 39,265

The 2012 Conference Premier play-off final, known as the 2012 Blue Square Bet Premier play-off final for sponsorship purposes, was a football match between Luton Town and York City on 20 May 2012 at Wembley Stadium in London. It was the tenth Conference Premier play-off final and the first to be played at Wembley since 2010. York won the match 2–1, coming from behind after conceding to Luton in the second minute to secure promotion to League Two, re-entering the Football League after an eight-year absence.

== Match ==
=== Details ===
20 May 2012
15:00 BST

Luton Town	1–2	York City
Gray 2'	Report	Chambers 26'; Blair 47'

Wembley Stadium, London
Attendance: 39,265
Referee: Jeremy Simpson

Luton Town	York City

GK	1	Mark Tyler
RB	18	Curtis Osano
CB	6	George Pilkington (c)
CB	34	János Kovács
LB	15	Jake Howells
RM	28	Adam Watkins	(substituted off) 61'
CM	4	Keith Keane
CM	7	Alex Lawless	Booked
LM	11	Robbie Willmott
FW	13	Stuart Fleetwood	(substituted off) 61'
FW	27	Andre Gray
Substitutes:
DF	2	Dan Gleeson
DF	12	Shane Blackett
MF	20	John Paul Kissock (substituted in) 61'
FW	9	Craig McAllister
FW	14	Aaron O'Connor (substituted in) 61'
Manager:
Paul Buckle

GK	24	Michael Ingham
RB	20	Jon Challinor	(substituted off) 37'
CB	4	Chris Smith	(c)
CB	23	Chris Doig
LB	27	Ben Gibson (yellow card)
CM	2	Lanre Oyebanjo
CM	6	Daniel Parslow
CM	3	James Meredith
RW	17	Matty Blair
CF	9	Jason Walker	(substituted off) 85'
LW	10	Ashley Chambers		(substituted off) 78'
Substitutes:
GK	1	Paul Musselwhite
MF	18	Adriano Moke
MF	19	Scott Brown	(substituted in) 37'
MF	26	Paddy McLaughlin	(substituted in) 85'
FW	7	Jamie Reed	(substituted in) 78'
Manager:
Gary Mills
