= 2023 CONCACAF Gold Cup Group A =

Football competition

Group A of the 2023 CONCACAF Gold Cup consisted of co-host nation the United States, Jamaica, Trinidad and Tobago and Saint Kitts and Nevis. Nicaragua originally qualified as winners of CONCACAF Nations League B Group C, but were disqualified for fielding ineligible players. They were replaced by Trinidad and Tobago, the runners-up in Group C who had originally qualified for the preliminary round. The group stage was divided between four groups who played from June 24 to July 2, 2023. The top two teams, the United States and Jamaica, advanced to the quarter-finals, while the other two teams were eliminated.

== Standings ==
| Pos | Team | Pld | W | D | L | GF | GA | GD | Pts | Qualification |
|---|---|---|---|---|---|---|---|---|---|---|
| 1 | United States (H) | 3 | 2 | 1 | 0 | 13 | 1 | +12 | 7 | Advance to knockout stage |
| 2 | Jamaica | 3 | 2 | 1 | 0 | 10 | 2 | +8 | 7 | Advance to knockout stage |
| 3 | Trinidad and Tobago | 3 | 1 | 0 | 2 | 4 | 10 | −6 | 3 | |
| 4 | Saint Kitts and Nevis | 3 | 0 | 0 | 3 | 0 | 14 | −14 | 0 | |

Source: CONCACAF
Rules for classification: Tiebreakers
(H) Co-host

In the quarter-finals:

- The winners of Group A, United States, advanced to play the runners-up of Group D.
- The runners-up of Group A, Jamaica, advanced to play the winners of Group D.

== Matches ==
=== United States vs Jamaica ===
The two teams had met 31 times previously, seven of them in the Gold Cup, including the final won 2–1 by the United States in 2017.

June 24, 2023
22:06 (21:06 UTC−5) (Note: The United States vs Jamaica match, originally scheduled at 21:30 EDT (UTC−4), was re-scheduled for 22:06 EDT.)

| United States | 1–1 | Jamaica |
|---|---|---|
| Vázquez 88' | Report | Lowe 13' |

Soldier Field, Chicago
Attendance: 36,666
Referee: César Ramos (Mexico)

| United States | Jamaica |

| GK | 1 | Matt Turner (c) |
| RB | 2 | DeAndre Yedlin |
| CB | 4 | Matt Miazga |
| CB | 3 | Aaron Long | (substituted off) 46' |
| LB | 21 | John Tolkin | (substituted off) 82' |
| CM | 16 | Aidan Morris |
| CM | 8 | James Sands |
| RW | 17 | Alejandro Zendejas | (substituted off) 66' |
| AM | 7 | Alan Soñora | (substituted off) 65' |
| LW | 13 | Jordan Morris | (substituted off) 55' |
| CF | 9 | Jesús Ferreira |
Substitutions:
| DF | 20 | Jalen Neal | (substituted on) 46' |
| FW | 11 | Cade Cowell | (substituted on) 55' |
| MF | 10 | Cristian Roldan | (substituted on) 65' |
| MF | 14 | Djordje Mihailovic | (substituted on) 66' |
| FW | 19 | Brandon Vázquez | (substituted on) 82' |
Interim manager:
B. J. Callaghan

| GK | 1 | Andre Blake (c) | (yellow card) 85' |
| RB | 2 | Dexter Lembikisa |
| CB | 17 | Damion Lowe | (yellow card) 3' |
| CB | 19 | Adrian Mariappa |
| LB | 4 | Amari'i Bell | | (substituted off) 65' |
| RM | 10 | Bobby De Cordova-Reid |
| CM | 3 | Kevon Lambert |
| CM | 15 | Joel Latibeaudiere |
| LM | 12 | Demarai Gray | | (substituted off) 90' |
| CF | 7 | Leon Bailey | | (substituted off) 90' |
| CF | 18 | Michail Antonio | | (substituted off) 75' |
Substitutions:
| DF | 20 | Kemar Lawrence | (yellow card) 84' | (substituted on) 65' |
| FW | 9 | Cory Burke | | (substituted on) 75' |
| MF | 8 | Daniel Johnson | | (substituted on) 90' |
| FW | 11 | Shamar Nicholson | | (substituted on) 90' |
Manager:
(Iceland) Heimir Hallgrímsson

Man of the Match:
Matt Turner (United States)

Assistant referees:
Alberto Morín (Mexico)
Marco Bisguerra (Mexico)
Fourth official:
Fernando Guerrero (Mexico)
Video assistant referee:
Erick Miranda (Mexico)
Assistant video assistant referee:
Jorge Pérez Durán (Mexico)

=== Trinidad and Tobago vs Saint Kitts and Nevis ===
The match marked Saint Kitts and Nevis' debut at the Gold Cup. The two teams had met in 13 previous matches, with 12 victories for Trinidad and Tobago and only one for Saint Kitts and Nevis.

June 25, 2023
16:00 (Note: The Trinidad and Tobago vs Saint Kitts and Nevis match, originally scheduled at 15:30 EDT (UTC−4), was delayed until 16:00 EDT by weather conditions.)

| Trinidad and Tobago | 3–0 | Saint Kitts and Nevis |
|---|---|---|
| A. Jones 43'; Fortune 65'; Ible 73' (o.g.) | Report |

DRV PNK Stadium, Fort Lauderdale
Attendance: 3,646
Referee: Saíd Martínez (Honduras)

| Trinidad and Tobago | Saint Kitts and Nevis |

| GK | 21 | Nicklas Frenderup |
| RB | 16 | Alvin Jones |
| CB | 12 | Kareem Moses |
| CB | 4 | Sheldon Bateau |
| LB | 18 | Triston Hodge |
| CM | 17 | Andre Rampersad | (substituted off) 79' |
| CM | 15 | Neveal Hackshaw |
| RW | 7 | Ryan Telfer | (substituted off) 59' |
| AM | 10 | Kevin Molino (c) | (substituted off) 59' |
| LW | 20 | Kaïlé Auvray | (substituted off) 84' |
| CF | 11 | Levi García | (substituted off) 79' |
Substitutions:
| MF | 8 | Ajani Fortune | (substituted on) 59' |
| FW | 19 | Malcolm Shaw | (substituted on) 59' |
| MF | 6 | Luke Singh | (substituted on) 79' |
| FW | 13 | Real Gill | (substituted on) 79' |
| DF | 3 | Joevin Jones | (substituted on) 84' |
Manager:
Angus Eve

| GK | 18 | Julani Archibald (c) |
| RB | 2 | Malique Roberts |
| CB | 6 | Lois Maynard |
| CB | 4 | Andre Burley | (yellow card) 85' |
| LB | 5 | Jameel Ible |
| RM | 21 | Omari Sterling-James | | (substituted off) 63' |
| CM | 14 | Raheem Somersall | (yellow card) 26' | (substituted off) 73' |
| CM | 8 | Yohannes Mitchum | | (substituted off) 79' |
| LM | 7 | Tiquanny Williams | | (substituted off) 73' |
| CF | 19 | Romaine Sawyers |
| CF | 16 | Keithroy Freeman | | (substituted off) 63' |
Substitutions:
| MF | 11 | Tyquan Terrell | | (substituted on) 63' |
| FW | 10 | Jacob Hazel | | (substituted on) 63' |
| MF | 15 | Mervin Lewis | | (substituted on) 73' |
| MF | 22 | Ronaldo Belgrove | | (substituted on) 73' |
| FW | 17 | Rowan Liburd | | (substituted on) 79' |
Manager:
Austin Huggins

Man of the Match:
Alvin Jones (Trinidad and Tobago)

Assistant referees:
Walter López (Honduras)
Christian Ramírez (Honduras)
Fourth official:
Keylor Herrera (Costa Rica)
Video assistant referee:
Melissa Borjas (Honduras)
Assistant video assistant referee:
Ismael Cornejo (El Salvador)

=== Jamaica vs Trinidad and Tobago ===
The two teams had faced each other 62 times previously, but never in the Gold Cup. Their most recent meetings were a series of two friendlies played in March 2023, with Trinidad and Tobago winning 1–0 and the sides played to a scoreless draw.

June 28, 2023
19:30 (18:30 UTC−5)

| Jamaica | 4–1 | Trinidad and Tobago |
|---|---|---|
| Gray 14', 30'; Bailey 18'; Richards 90+2' | Report | Rampersad 49' |

CityPark, St. Louis
Attendance: 21,216
Referee: Fernando Guerrero (Mexico)

| Jamaica | Trinidad and Tobago |

| GK | 1 | Andre Blake (c) |
| RB | 21 | Javain Brown | (yellow card) 9' | (substituted off) 61' |
| CB | 17 | Damion Lowe | (yellow card) 75' |
| CB | 6 | Di'Shon Bernard |
| LB | 20 | Kemar Lawrence | | (substituted off) 46' |
| RM | 10 | Bobby De Cordova-Reid | | (substituted off) 61' |
| CM | 3 | Kevon Lambert |
| CM | 15 | Joel Latibeaudiere |
| LM | 12 | Demarai Gray |
| CF | 18 | Michail Antonio | | (substituted off) 76' |
| CF | 7 | Leon Bailey | | (substituted off) 81' |
Substitutions:
| DF | 2 | Dexter Lembikisa | | (substituted on) 46' |
| MF | 8 | Daniel Johnson | | (substituted on) 61' |
| FW | 11 | Shamar Nicholson | | (substituted on) 61' |
| FW | 9 | Cory Burke | (yellow card) 80' | (substituted on) 76' |
| FW | 14 | Dujuan Richards | | (substituted on) 81' |
Manager:
(Iceland) Heimir Hallgrímsson

| GK | 21 | Nicklas Frenderup |
| CB | 4 | Sheldon Bateau | (yellow card) 41' |
| CB | 12 | Kareem Moses |
| CB | 2 | Aubrey David | | (substituted off) 46' |
| RWB | 16 | Alvin Jones | (yellow card) 73' |
| LWB | 14 | Shannon Gomez | | (substituted off) 76' |
| RM | 19 | Malcolm Shaw | | (substituted off) 46' |
| CM | 17 | Andre Rampersad | | (substituted off) 63' |
| CM | 15 | Neveal Hackshaw | (yellow card) 5' |
| LM | 8 | Ajani Fortune | | (substituted off) 46' |
| CF | 11 | Levi García (c) |
Substitutions:
| MF | 3 | Joevin Jones | | (substituted on) 46' |
| DF | 18 | Triston Hodge | | (substituted on) 46' |
| FW | 20 | Kaïlé Auvray | | (substituted on) 46' |
| MF | 10 | Kevin Molino | | (substituted on) 63' |
| MF | 23 | Molik Jesse Khan | | (substituted on) 76' |
Manager:
Angus Eve

Man of the Match:
Demarai Gray (Jamaica)

Assistant referees:
Enrique Bustos (Mexico)
Jorge Sánchez (Mexico)
Fourth official:
Reon Radix (Grenada)
Video assistant referee:
Benjamín Pineda (Costa Rica)
Assistant video assistant referee:
Ricardo Montero (Costa Rica)

=== Saint Kitts and Nevis vs United States ===
Although both CONCACAF members, the two teams had never met before.

June 28, 2023
21:30 (20:30 UTC−5)

| Saint Kitts and Nevis | 0–6 | United States |
|---|---|---|
| | Report | Mihailovic 12', 79'; Reynolds 14'; Ferreira 16', 25', 50' |

CityPark, St. Louis
Attendance: 21,216
Referee: Juan Gabriel Calderón (Costa Rica)

| Saint Kitts and Nevis | United States |

| GK | 18 | Julani Archibald (c) |
| RB | 2 | Malique Roberts |
| CB | 6 | Lois Maynard |
| CB | 3 | Gerard Williams |
| LB | 5 | Jameel Ible | (yellow card) 69' | (substituted off) 71' |
| DM | 4 | Andre Burley | (yellow card) 74' |
| RM | 7 | Tiquanny Williams | | (substituted off) 63' |
| CM | 19 | Romaine Sawyers |
| CM | 14 | Raheem Somersall | | (substituted off) 63' |
| LM | 11 | Tyquan Terrell | (yellow card) 56' | (substituted off) 63' |
| CF | 16 | Keithroy Freeman | | (substituted off) 71' |
Substitutions:
| MF | 8 | Yohannes Mitchum | | (substituted on) 63' |
| FW | 9 | Carlos Bertie | | (substituted on) 63' |
| FW | 21 | Omari Sterling-James | | (substituted on) 63' |
| MF | 15 | Mervin Lewis | | (substituted on) 71' |
| FW | 10 | Jacob Hazel | | (substituted on) 71' |
Manager:
Austin Huggins

| GK | 18 | Sean Johnson (c) |
| RB | 5 | Bryan Reynolds | (substituted off) 76' |
| CB | 4 | Matt Miazga |
| CB | 20 | Jalen Neal |
| LB | 15 | DeJuan Jones |
| CM | 6 | Gianluca Busio | (substituted off) 46' |
| CM | 8 | James Sands | (substituted off) 57' |
| CM | 14 | Djordje Mihailovic |
| RF | 17 | Alejandro Zendejas |
| CF | 9 | Jesús Ferreira | (substituted off) 57' |
| LF | 11 | Cade Cowell | (substituted off) 68' |
Substitutions:
| MF | 7 | Alan Soñora | (substituted on) 46' |
| MF | 16 | Aidan Morris | (substituted on) 57' |
| FW | 19 | Brandon Vázquez | (substituted on) 57' |
| MF | 10 | Cristian Roldan | (substituted on) 68' |
| FW | 22 | Julian Gressel | (substituted on) 76' |
Interim manager:
B. J. Callaghan

Man of the Match:
Jesús Ferreira (United States)

Assistant referees:
Juan Carlos Mora (Costa Rica)
Henri Pupiro (Nicaragua)
Fourth official:
Bryan López (Guatemala)
Video assistant referee:
Selvin Brown (Honduras)
Assistant video assistant referee:
Shirley Perelló (Honduras)

=== United States vs Trinidad and Tobago ===
The two teams had faced each other in 27 previous matches including four times in the Gold Cup group stage, all won by the United States (2–1 in the Gold Cup's inaugural edition in 1991, 3–2 in 1996, 2–0 in 2007 and 6–0 in 2019).

July 2, 2023
19:00

| United States | 6–0 | Trinidad and Tobago |
|---|---|---|
| Ferreira 14', 38', 45+3' (pen.); Cowell 65'; Busio 79'; Vázquez 90+4' | Report |

Bank of America Stadium, Charlotte
Attendance: 47,382
Referee: Mario Escobar (Guatemala)

| United States | Trinidad and Tobago |

| GK | 1 | Matt Turner (c) |
| RB | 5 | Bryan Reynolds | | (substituted off) 77' |
| CB | 12 | Miles Robinson | | (substituted off) 46' |
| CB | 20 | Jalen Neal | (yellow card) 53' |
| LB | 15 | DeJuan Jones |
| CM | 6 | Gianluca Busio |
| CM | 8 | James Sands |
| CM | 14 | Djordje Mihailovic | | (substituted off) 70' |
| RF | 17 | Alejandro Zendejas | | (substituted off) 61' |
| CF | 9 | Jesús Ferreira |
| LF | 10 | Cristian Roldan | | (substituted off) 61' |
Substitutions:
| DF | 4 | Matt Miazga | | (substituted on) 46' |
| DF | 22 | Julian Gressel | | (substituted on) 61' |
| FW | 11 | Cade Cowell | | (substituted on) 61' |
| FW | 19 | Brandon Vázquez | | (substituted on) 70' |
| DF | 2 | DeAndre Yedlin | | (substituted on) 77' |
Interim manager:
B. J. Callaghan (interim)

| GK | 1 | Marvin Phillip |
| RB | 16 | Alvin Jones |
| CB | 5 | Leland Archer |
| CB | 4 | Sheldon Bateau |
| LB | 18 | Triston Hodge | | (substituted off) 65' |
| CM | 6 | Luke Singh | | (substituted off) 46' |
| CM | 15 | Neveal Hackshaw |
| RW | 11 | Levi García |
| AM | 10 | Kevin Molino (c) | (yellow card) 40' | (substituted off) 46' |
| LW | 3 | Joevin Jones | | (substituted off) 46' |
| CF | 19 | Malcolm Shaw | | (substituted off) 70' |
Substitutions:
| DF | 14 | Shannon Gomez | | (substituted on) 46' |
| MF | 17 | Andre Rampersad | | (substituted on) 46' |
| FW | 13 | Real Gill | | (substituted on) 47' |
| FW | 9 | Kadeem Corbin | | (substituted on) 65' |
| FW | 20 | Kaïlé Auvray | | (substituted on) 70' |
Manager:
Angus Eve

Man of the Match:
Jesús Ferreira (United States)

Assistant referees:
Luis Ventura (Guatemala)
Humberto Panjoj (Guatemala)
Fourth official:
Randy Encarnación (Dominican Republic)
Video assistant referee:
Benjamín Pineda (Costa Rica)
Assistant video assistant referee:
Ricardo Montero (Costa Rica)

=== Jamaica vs Saint Kitts and Nevis ===
The two teams had met ten times previously, most recently in a friendly in 2018, won 3–1 by Jamaica. This was the first-ever Gold Cup match between the two sides, as Saint Kitts and Nevis was making its debut in the tournament.

July 2, 2023
19:00 (16:00 UTC−7)

| Jamaica | 5–0 | Saint Kitts and Nevis |
|---|---|---|
| Archibald 30' (o.g.); Russell 45+2'; Bernard 49'; Johnson 72'; Burke 74' | Report |

Levi's Stadium, Santa Clara
Attendance: 60,347
Referee: Adonai Escobedo (Mexico)

| Jamaica | Saint Kitts and Nevis |

| GK | 23 | Jahmali Waite | (substituted off) 82' |
| RB | 2 | Dexter Lembikisa |
| CB | 6 | Di'Shon Bernard |
| CB | 19 | Adrian Mariappa (c) |
| LB | 4 | Amari'i Bell |
| RM | 16 | Kaheem Parris | (substituted off) 61' |
| CM | 22 | Jon Russell | (substituted off) 46' |
| CM | 15 | Joel Latibeaudiere |
| LM | 12 | Demarai Gray | (substituted off) 81' |
| CF | 7 | Leon Bailey |
| CF | 18 | Michail Antonio | (substituted off) 46' |
Substitutions:
| MF | 8 | Daniel Johnson | (substituted on) 46' |
| FW | 11 | Shamar Nicholson | (substituted on) 46' |
| FW | 9 | Cory Burke | (substituted on) 61' |
| FW | 14 | Dujuan Richards | (substituted on) 81' |
| GK | 13 | Coniah Boyce-Clarke | (substituted on) 82' |
Manager:
(Iceland) Heimir Hallgrímsson

| GK | 18 | Julani Archibald (c) | | (substituted off) 64' |
| RB | 2 | Malique Roberts | (yellow card) 48' |
| CB | 6 | Lois Maynard | | (substituted off) 72' |
| CB | 3 | Gerard Williams |
| LB | 20 | Raheem Hanley |
| DM | 14 | Raheem Somersall | | (substituted off) 60' |
| RM | 7 | Tiquanny Williams |
| CM | 8 | Yohannes Mitchum |
| CM | 19 | Romaine Sawyers |
| LM | 21 | Omari Sterling-James | | (substituted off) 61' |
| CF | 17 | Rowan Liburd | | (substituted off) 60' |
Substitutions:
| MF | 15 | Mervin Lewis | (yellow card) 77' | (substituted on) 60' |
| FW | 10 | Jacob Hazel | | (substituted on) 60' |
| MF | 22 | Ronaldo Belgrove | | (substituted on) 61' |
| GK | 1 | Jamal Jeffers Francis | | (substituted on) 64' |
| DF | 12 | Dijhorn Simmonds | | (substituted on) 72' |
Manager:
Austin Higgins

Man of the Match:
Di'Shon Bernard (Jamaica)

Assistant referees:
Christian Espinosa (Mexico)
Karen Díaz (Mexico)
Fourth official:
Keylor Herrera (Costa Rica)
Video assistant referee:
Selvin Brown (Honduras)
Assistant video assistant referee:
Jorge Pérez Durán (Mexico)
