= 2012–13 York City F.C. season =

Association football club season

York City F.C.
2012–13 season
- Chairman: Jason McGill
- Manager: Gary Mills (until 2 March 2013); Nigel Worthington (from 4 March 2013)
- Ground: Bootham Crescent
- League Two: 17th
- FA Cup: First round (eliminated by AFC Wimbledon)
- League Cup: First round (eliminated by Doncaster Rovers)
- Football League Trophy: Second round (eliminated by Coventry City)
- Top goalscorer: League: Ashley Chambers (10); All: Ashley Chambers (10)
- Highest home attendance: 5,975 vs Southend United, League Two, 20 April 2013
- Lowest home attendance: 2,699 vs Gillingham, League Two, 12 February 2013
- Average home league attendance: 3,879
| Home colours | Away colours |

The 2012–13 season was the 91st season of competitive association football and 76th season in the Football League played by York City Football Club, a professional football club based in York, North Yorkshire, England. Their promotion via the Conference Premier play-offs in 2011–12 meant they played in League Two, after an eight-year absence from the Football League. The season ran from 1 July 2012 to 30 June 2013.

Manager Gary Mills signed eight players before the close of the summer transfer window. Having stood 14th in the league table on New Year's Day, York were on an 11-match run without a win when Mills was dismissed in March 2013. He was replaced by former Northern Ireland manager Nigel Worthington, who led York to safety from relegation on the final day of the season. Having won four of their last five matches, the team finished the season 17th in the table. They lost in their opening round matches in both the 2012–13 FA Cup and the League Cup, and were eliminated in the second round of the Football League Trophy.

36 players made at least one appearance in nationally organised first-team competition, and there were 12 different goalscorers. Goalkeeper Michael Ingham played in all 50 first-team matches over the season. Ashley Chambers finished as leading scorer with 10 goals, all scored in the league. The winner of the Clubman of the Year award, voted for by the club's supporters, was Daniel Parslow, who became the first player to win the award for a third time.

== Background and pre-season ==
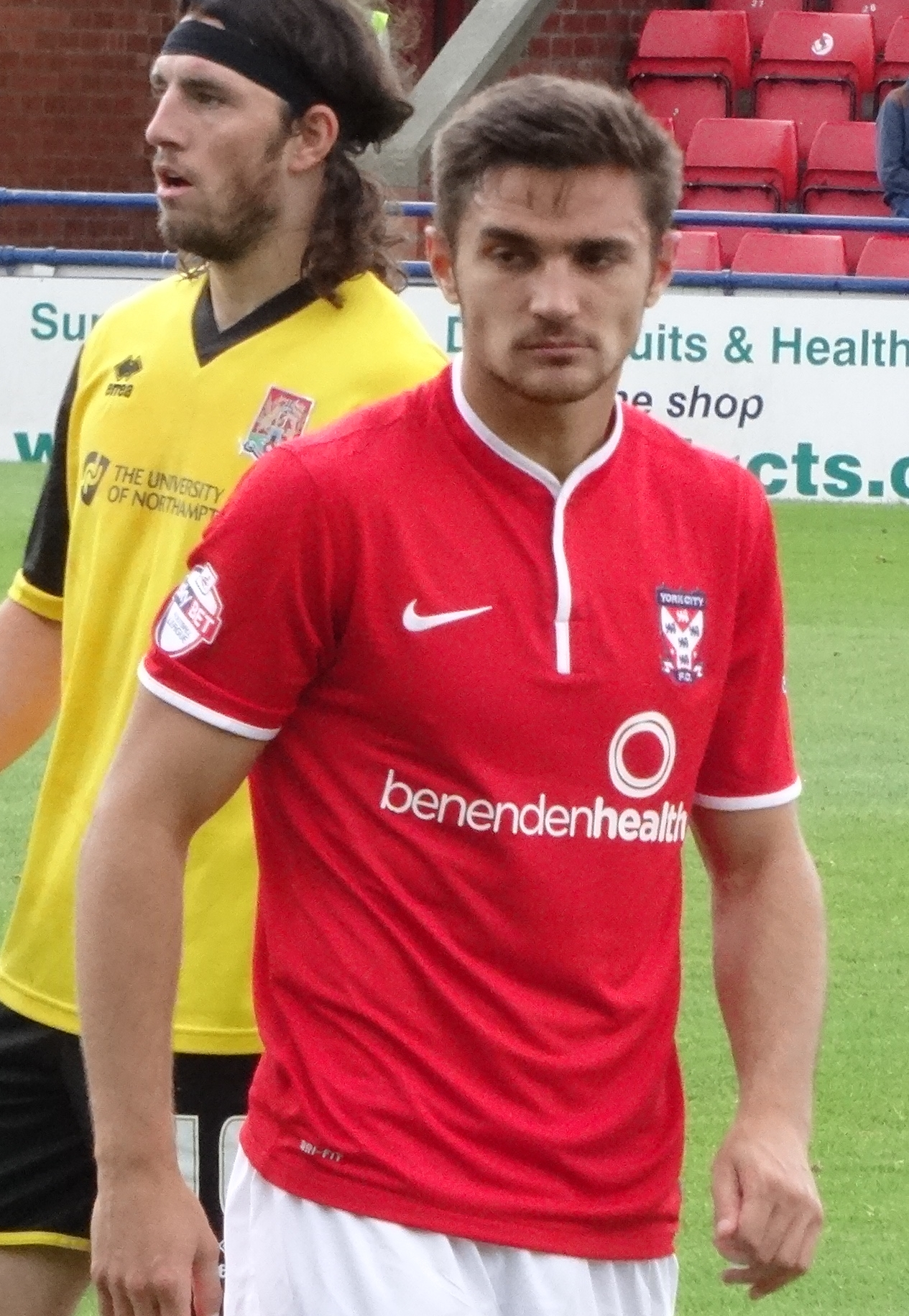
Youth-team captain Tom Platt signed a professional contract with the club.

The 2011–12 season was Gary Mills' first full season as York City manager, having taken over the role in October 2010. York finished the season with two major trophies after victories in the 2012 FA Trophy final and the 2012 Conference Premier play-off final, both of which were staged at Wembley Stadium. The FA Trophy victory represented York's first piece of silverware in 19 years and was achieved with a 2–0 victory over York's Conference Premier rivals Newport County. With goals from Ashley Chambers and Matty Blair, York beat Luton Town 2–1 in the play-off final to return to the Football League after an eight-year absence with promotion to League Two.

Following the previous season's conclusion Moses Ashikodi, Matthew Blinkhorn, Eugen Bopp and Scott Brown were released, while James Meredith, Adriano Moke and Danny Pilkington departed for Bradford City, Cambridge United and Kidderminster Harriers respectively. Jon Challinor, Chambers, Chris Doig, Jamal Fyfield, Michael Ingham, Scott Kerr and Daniel Parslow signed new contracts with York. New players signed ahead of the start of the season were defender Danny Blanchett from Burton Albion, midfielders Lee Bullock from Bradford City, John McReady from Darlington 1883 and Jonathan Smith from Swindon Town, winger Michael Coulson from Grimsby Town and striker Oli Johnson from Oxford United. Midfielder Tom Platt, the previous season's youth-team captain and Youth Team Player of the Year, entered the first-team squad after agreeing a professional contract.

The team adopted new home and away kits, with the home kit featuring red shirts with white sleeves, light blue shorts and white socks. The away kit comprised light blue shirts with white sleeves, white shorts and light blue socks. This was accompanied by a change in shirt sponsor, with Benenden Health's name becoming present on the team kits.

Pre-season match details
| Date | Opponents | Venue | Result | Score F–A | Scorers | Attendance | Ref. |
|---|---|---|---|---|---|---|---|
| 13 July 2012 | Huntington Rovers | A | W | 8–0 | McLaughlin, Coulson, McReady, Hartas o.g., Kelly (2), J. Reed, Henderson | 750 (est) | |
| 17 July 2012 | Harrogate Railway Athletic | A | W | 3–0 | Walker (3) 19', 40', 41' | | |
| 18 July 2012 | Pickering Town | A | W | 6–2 | Potts, McReady (2), McLaughlin (2), Kelly | | |
| 21 July 2012 | Oldham Athletic | H | L | 0–2 | | 1,335 | |
| 24 July 2012 | Gateshead | A | W | 2–0 | J. Reed 15', Knowles (Note: Trialist) 20' | 402 | |
| 28 July 2012 | Grantham Town | A | D | 1–1 | McLaughlin 62' | 232 | |
| 31 July 2012 | Leicester City | A | D | 2–2 | Chambers, Coulson | (Note: Match played behind closed doors) | |
| 4 August 2012 | Middlesbrough | H | L | 1–2 | J. Reed 71' pen. | 1,865 | |
| 7 August 2012 | Sunderland | H | W | 3–0 | Coulson (2) 7', 27', Chambers 16' | 1,055 | |

== Review ==
=== August ===
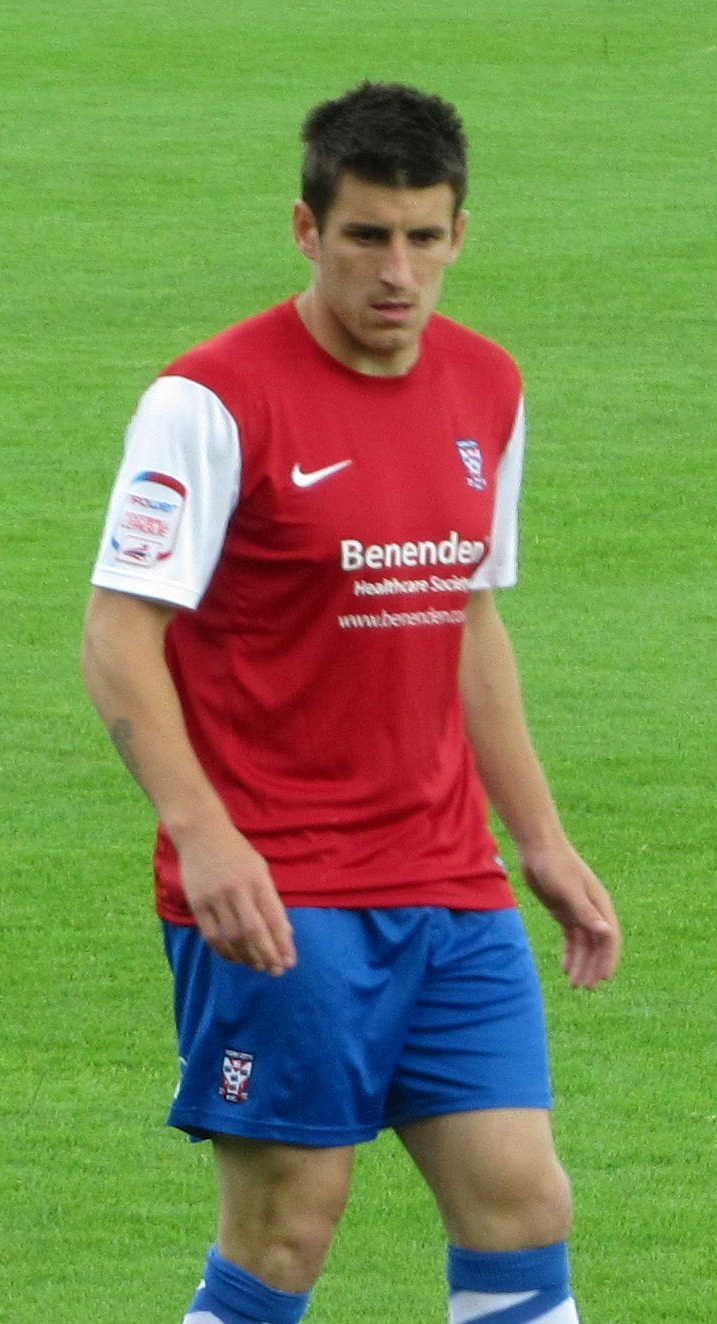
Michael Coulson scored York's first goal of the season with a long-range strike against Doncaster Rovers in a League Cup match.

York started the season away to League One club Doncaster Rovers in the first round of the League Cup. Debutant Coulson gave York the lead with a long-range strike in the 65th minute before Chris Brown equalised for Doncaster, scoring a penalty kick nine minutes later. The match finished 1–1 after extra time and York went on to lose the penalty shoot-out 4–2. York's Football League return ended in defeat, being beaten 3–1 at home to Wycombe Wanderers. Wycombe took a three-goal lead before Jason Walker scored York's consolation in the 54th minute. York recorded their first point of the season after drawing 2–2 away to Morecambe, with Chris Smith and Chambers scoring the team's goals in the second half. This was followed by their first league victory, with Parslow, Chambers and Coulson scoring in the first half away to Barnet in a 3–1 win. Two days before the transfer deadline York signed three new players; defender Clarke Carlisle and striker Scott Dobie signed on free transfers and Charlie Taylor came on loan from Leeds United.

=== September ===
Coulson scored after 15 seconds to give York the lead at home to league leaders Oxford United, and with further goals from Chambers and Paddy McLaughlin the team went on to win 3–1. York won 1–0 away in the first round of the Football League Trophy against Rotherham United, with Blair scoring an 80th-minute winner. Walker's equaliser in the fifth minute of stoppage time secured a 2–2 draw at home to Chesterfield. There had been three goals scored in a five-minute period in the first half; Chesterfield opened the scoring through Sam Hird and Coulson equalised for York before Craig Westcarr restored the visitors' lead. York drew their next match 1–1 away to Exeter City, having taken the lead through Coulson in the 52nd minute before the home team equalised when John O'Flynn scored in the 83rd minute. The team's first away defeat of the season came with a 3–1 defeat away to Burton Albion; after McLaughlin gave York a ninth-minute lead, Burton went on to win with goals from Lee Bell, Calvin Zola and Matt Paterson. A third draw in four matches came after York drew 0–0 at home to Cheltenham Town. Platt and Liam Henderson were sent out to Harrogate Town and Gainsborough Trinity on three-month and one-month loans respectively, while Dobie was released and Taylor had his loan extended for a second month. York's run of four matches without victory came to an end after a 2–0 win away to Aldershot Town, with Blair and Walker scoring in the second half.

=== October ===
The previous season's Conference Premier champions Fleetwood Town defeated York 2–0 at home, with goals in each half scored by Junior Brown and Steven Gillespie. Peterborough United midfielder Daniel Kearns was signed on a one-month loan and made his debut as a substitute in York's 0–0 home draw with Rotherham. York were knocked out of the Football League Trophy in the second round after being beaten 4–0 at home by League One team Coventry City. Chambers scored the opening goal for York away to Bradford in the first derby match between the teams in 16 years, but with Bradford scoring through Zavon Hines the match finished a 1–1 draw. Chambers and Blair scored as York beat Dagenham & Redbridge 3–2 at home, which was the team's first win in four league matches. York recorded a second successive victory away to Accrington Stanley, with Walker scoring an 83rd-minute winner in a 1–0 win. Bullock was loaned out to Gateshead of the Conference Premier for a month, with his appearances in the team being limited. A 0–0 draw away to Southend United saw York's run of victories come to an end.

=== November ===
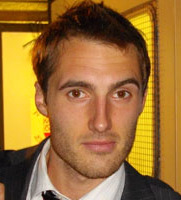
Alex Rodman joined on loan from Aldershot Town.

Coulson was ruled out for the season with a cruciate ligament injury, while Kearns' loan was extended for a further two months. York conceded an 80th-minute equaliser at home to AFC Wimbledon in the first round of the FA Cup, with Charlie Strutton the scorer, after substitute Jamie Reed had earlier given York the lead. Jonathan Smith was loaned to Conference Premier club Luton until January 2013, having not started a match since September 2012. Blair gave York the lead at home to Northampton Town, and despite playing most of the match with ten men, the away team equalised through Adebayo Akinfenwa. Winger Alex Rodman, who had previously played under Mills at Tamworth, was signed on a two-month loan from Aldershot. He made his debut in York's home league match against AFC Wimbledon, which finished as a 3–0 defeat, with the visitors scoring their goals in the second half.

York were knocked out of the FA Cup after a 4–3 extra-time defeat away to AFC Wimbledon in a first round replay. Jamie Reed scored in the 89th minute to hand York a 2–2 draw away to Port Vale, after Rodman had scored his first goal for the club earlier in the second half. Carlisle was loaned to divisional rivals Northampton ahead of a permanent transfer in January 2013, while Henderson joined Gateshead on loan and Bullock had his loan extended. York fell to a second successive home defeat after being beaten 2–0 by Torquay United, the away team scoring in each half through Danny Stevens and Joe Oastler. Despite his loan earlier being extended until January 2013, Kearns was recalled by Peterborough, having made 12 appearances for York.

=== December ===
York recorded their first win in eight matches after defeating Rochdale 3–2 away, with Michael Potts scoring twice and Walker scoring once in the first half. Youth-team defender Tom Allan signed a one-and-a-half-year professional contract with the club, with Mills saying, "Tom has come on unbelievably in the last 12 months and thoroughly deserves his first professional contract". York fell to a 2–0 defeat away to Plymouth Argyle, with Fyfield scoring an own goal in the 45th minute and Nick Chadwick scoring in the 90th minute. Jonathan Smith and Bullock were recalled from their loans ahead of York's home match against Bristol Rovers. York scored four first half goals to beat Bristol Rovers 4–1, with Garry Kenneth scoring an own goal, Chambers scoring twice and Walker scoring once. A second successive away defeat came away to Chesterfield on Boxing Day when York were beaten 3–0, with the home team scoring their goals during the second half. This run ended after a 0–0 draw away to Fleetwood, in which York missed a number of chances to score in the first half.

=== January ===
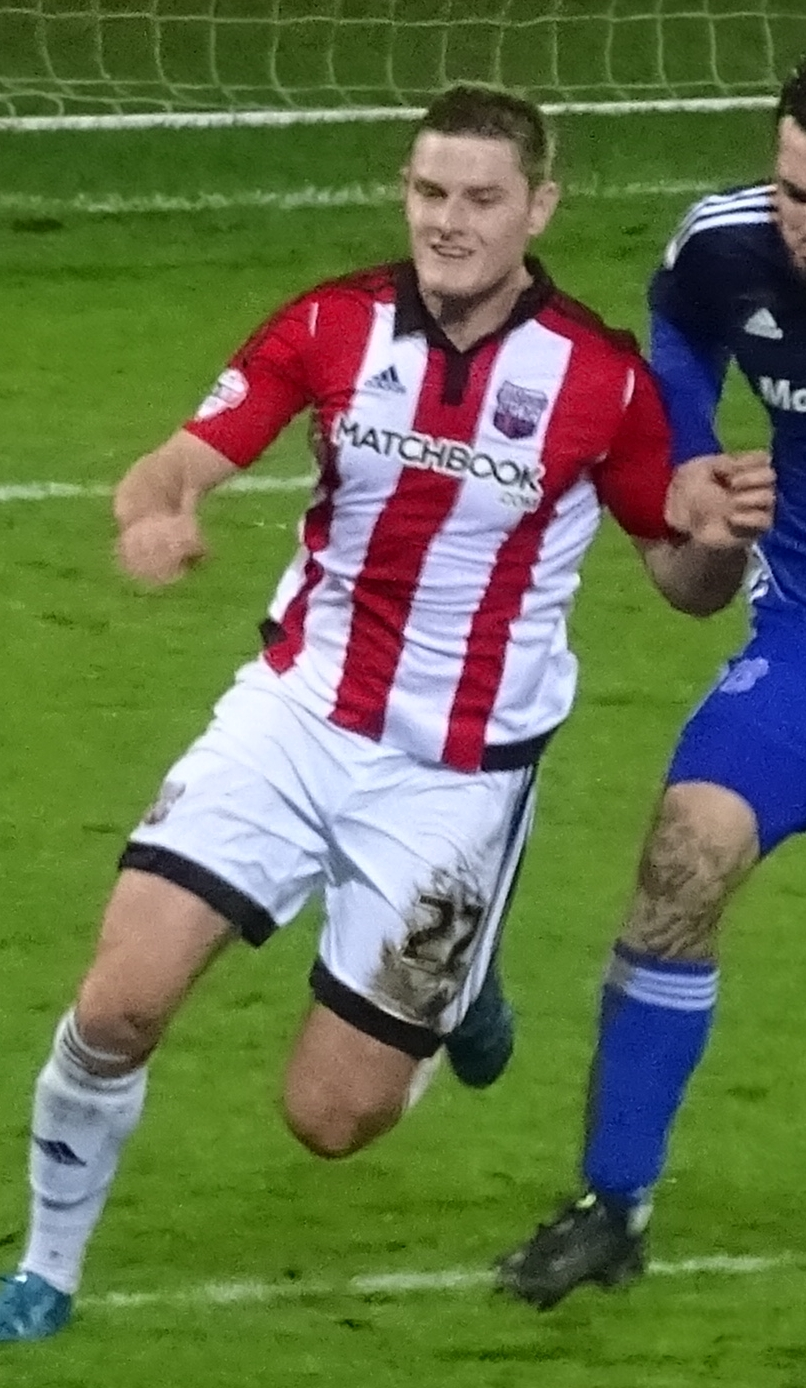
Jack O'Connell was signed from Blackburn Rovers on loan.

Jonathan Smith made a permanent move to Luton for a fee of £50,000 shortly after the transfer window opened. York won 3–0 in their New Year's Day home fixture against Burton, with Walker, McLaughlin and Blair scoring. Carlisle completed a permanent transfer to Northampton after the conclusion of his loan, while Henderson signed for Gateshead permanently after an agreement was reached over the remainder of his York contract. York were beaten 2–1 at home to Exeter, with a Rodman own goal giving the visitors the lead in the 14th minute. Potts equalised for York five minutes later, before Exeter scored the winning goal on 53 minutes through Jimmy Keohane. Rodman's loan from Aldershot was extended until the end of the season. Walker scored in the 84th minute to secure York a 1–1 draw away to Cheltenham, who had taken the lead in the 67th minute through Shaun Harrad. Striker Ben Everson, who last played for Breiðablik in the Úrvalsdeild karla, was signed on a contract for the rest of the season. Platt was loaned out for the second time in a season, joining Conference North club FC Halifax Town for one month. Everson made his debut as a 71st-minute substitute in a 0–0 draw at home to Aldershot.

Blackburn Rovers defender Jack O'Connell was signed on a one-month loan, while Salford City defender Jameel Ible was signed on a contract for the rest of the season. Blanchett was released after his contract was cancelled by mutual consent. York were leading Gillingham 1–0 away before the home team equalised five minutes from time through Cody McDonald, with York having taken the lead in the 17th minute through a McLaughlin goal straight from a corner kick. Striker David McDaid was signed from League of Ireland Premier Division club Derry City on a one-and-a-half-year contract for a small compensation fee, while defender Curtis Obeng was signed on a one-month loan from Premier League club Swansea City after Lanre Oyebanjo was ruled out for around six weeks with a fractured skull.

=== February ===
York were beaten 4–1 at home to Morecambe, with Walker scoring York's only goal with a first half penalty, before enduring their largest defeat of the season after losing 4–0 away to Wycombe. Jamie Reed was loaned to Cambridge United for the rest of the season, with his opportunities in the team limited. Burton midfielder John McGrath and Aldershot striker Michael Rankine were signed on loan, with the former joining for one month and the latter for the rest of the season. Both started in York's 0–0 draw at home to Gillingham. York opened the scoring against Barnet at home through a David Stephens own goal, although goals from Andy Yiadom and Jake Hyde saw the away team win 2–1. Everson was loaned out to Gateshead for a month, having struggled for opportunities in the team, and Platt returned to Harrogate on loan for the remainder of the season. York drew 0–0 away to Oxford, with the best chance of the match falling to Blair when he headed straight at goalkeeper Luke McCormick. O'Connell's loan was extended until the end of the season. Daniel Nardiello scored a stoppage-time equaliser for Rotherham when York were leading 1–0, after the away team had taken the lead through Blair earlier in the second half. Johnson was released after making seven appearances for the club, having been hindered during the season by stomach and groin problems.

=== March ===
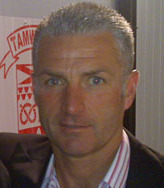
Gary Mills was dismissed as manager after 11 matches without a win, with Nigel Worthington being appointed his successor.

Mills was dismissed after nearly two and a half years in charge on 2 March 2013 after York were beaten 2–0 at home to Bradford, with the team sitting four points above the relegation zone after an 11-match run without a win. Former Northern Ireland manager Nigel Worthington was appointed as his successor two days later, with Fred Barber joining from Bury as his assistant. Mills' remaining coaching staff of Darron Gee, Des Lyttle and Paul Musselwhite left the club. Following his appointment, Worthington indicated the players out on loan would return to the club, saying, "It's only right that contracted players should be in and around the club over the next 10 matches as York City are paying their salaries and they should be part of anything that is going on in the next two months". Worthington's first signing was Sheffield Wednesday goalkeeper Arron Jameson, who joined on an emergency loan for the remainder of the season, while McGrath had his loan extended until the end of the season.

Worthington's first match in charge was a 3–2 defeat away to AFC Wimbledon, in which Chris Smith scored twice, before Harry Pell scored the home team's winner in the 79th minute. York picked up their first point under Worthington after a 0–0 home draw with Rochdale, with both teams having few opportunities to score. Ipswich Town midfielder Josh Carson was signed on a one-month loan, while Bullock was loaned to Stockport County of the Conference Premier for the rest of the season. Carson made his debut in York's 2–0 home defeat to Port Vale, who scored in each half through Jennison Myrie-Williams and Lee Hughes. Former York striker Richard Cresswell, who became the club's record sale in 1999, was signed from Sheffield United on a one-month loan. He scored a penalty in the team's 2–1 defeat away to Torquay, a result that saw York drop into the second relegation spot. Sunderland midfielder Adam Reed was signed on a one-month loan, while Ible was released. Adam Reed made his debut as York drew 0–0 away to Bristol Rovers, in which the home team's goalkeeper Steve Mildenhall made a number of saves.

=== April ===
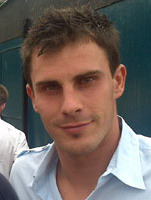
Chris Smith scored the winning goal against Dagenham & Redbridge on the last day of the season, when York secured survival against relegation.

York recorded their first win in 17 matches after beating Plymouth 2–0 at home, with Chambers and Cresswell scoring in the first half. McGrath, Rankine and Rodman were sent back to their parent clubs, having become surplus to requirements under Worthington. The team were denied a second successive win after Peter Murphy scored a stoppage-time equaliser for Accrington, with the match finishing a 1–1 home draw, after Adam Reed had given York the lead in first half stoppage time. Carson and Kerr were ruled out for the remainder of the season through injury, with the former returning to parent club Ipswich after the expiration of his loan. York recorded a second victory in three matches after winning 2–0 away to Northampton, who had been on a run of ten consecutive home wins, with Chambers scoring in the first half and John Johnson scoring an own goal in the second half. This result saw York rise out of the relegation zone by moving up to 20th place in the table, having occupied 23rd place following the previous four results. Cresswell was recalled from his loan by new Sheffield United caretaker manager Chris Morgan, after making an important contribution for York in their battle against relegation.

York picked up a third win in five matches by defeating Southend 2–1 at home with first half goals from Adam Reed and Blair. They remained in 20th position in the league following positive results for most of the teams surrounding them, meaning their relegation fight would not be concluded until after the last match of the season. Before the Southend match Parslow was named Clubman of the Year, voted for by the York supporters, becoming the first player to win the award on three occasions. York avoided relegation on the final day of the season after beating Dagenham 1–0 away, with Chris Smith scoring the only goal. This meant York finished their first season back in the Football League in 17th place in League Two, four points clear of the relegation zone.

== Summary and aftermath ==
York spent most of the season in midtable, rising as high as seventh place in September 2012 and dropping as low as 23rd in March 2013. The team recorded the second lowest number of wins in the League Two season with 12; bottom-placed Aldershot were the only team to win fewer matches with 11 victories. Ingham was the only ever-present player for York, appearing in all 51 matches. Chambers was top scorer with 10 goals in the league, being the only player to reach double figures, and was followed by Walker with nine goals.

Ahead of the new season, York released Bullock, Challinor, Doig, Everson, Kerr, McDaid, McLaughlin, Potts, Jamie Reed and Walker, while Blair left to sign for Fleetwood. David McGurk, Oyebanjo, Parslow, Platt and Chris Smith signed new contracts with the club. The club signed goalkeeper Chris Kettings on loan from Blackpool, defender Ben Davies on loan from Preston North End, midfielders Craig Clay from Chesterfield and Lewis Montrose from Gillingham, winger Sander Puri from St Mirren and strikers Ryan Bowman from Hereford United, Cresswell from Sheffield United, Wes Fletcher from Burnley and Ryan Jarvis from Torquay. Defender Mike Atkinson and striker Chris Dickinson entered the first-team squad from the youth team after agreeing professional contracts.

== Match details ==
League positions are sourced by Statto, while the remaining information is referenced individually.

=== League Two ===
Football League Two match details
| Date | League position | Opponents | Venue | Result | Score F–A | Scorers | Attendance | Ref. |
|---|---|---|---|---|---|---|---|---|
| 18 August 2012 | 17th | Wycombe Wanderers | H | L | 1–3 | Walker 54' | 4,591 | |
| 21 August 2012 | 19th | Morecambe | A | D | 2–2 | C. Smith 58', Chambers 87' | 2,063 | |
| 25 August 2012 | 12th | Barnet | A | W | 3–1 | Parslow 7', Chambers 16', Coulson 45' | 1,889 | |
| 1 September 2012 | 9th | Oxford United | H | W | 3–1 | Coulson 1', Chambers 15', McLaughlin 54' | 4,015 | |
| 8 September 2012 | 7th | Chesterfield | H | D | 2–2 | Coulson 40', Walker 90+5' | 5,119 | |
| 15 September 2012 | 9th | Exeter City | A | D | 1–1 | Coulson 52' | 4,092 | |
| 19 September 2012 | 15th | Burton Albion | A | L | 1–3 | McLaughlin 9' | 2,368 | |
| 22 September 2012 | 15th | Cheltenham Town | H | D | 0–0 | | 3,477 | |
| 29 September 2012 | 12th | Aldershot Town | A | W | 2–0 | Blair 49', Walker 52' pen. | 2,176 | |
| 2 October 2012 | 14th | Fleetwood Town | H | L | 0–2 | | 3,084 | |
| 6 October 2012 | 14th | Rotherham United | H | D | 0–0 | | 5,417 | |
| 13 October 2012 | 14th | Bradford City | A | D | 1–1 | Chambers 44' | 11,883 | |
| 20 October 2012 | 12th | Dagenham & Redbridge | H | W | 3–2 | Chambers (2) 19', 37', Blair 65' | 3,391 | |
| 23 October 2012 | 9th | Accrington Stanley | A | W | 1–0 | Walker 83' | 1,506 | |
| 27 October 2012 | 10th | Southend United | A | D | 0–0 | | 5,397 | |
| 6 November 2012 | 10th | Northampton Town | H | D | 1–1 | Blair 23' | 3,039 | |
| 10 November 2012 | 13th | AFC Wimbledon | H | L | 0–3 | | 3,585 | |
| 17 November 2012 | 13th | Port Vale | A | D | 2–2 | Rodman 67', J. Reed 89' | 5,380 | |
| 24 November 2012 | 17th | Torquay United | H | L | 0–2 | | 3,174 | |
| 1 December 2012 | 14th | Rochdale | A | W | 3–2 | Potts (2) 7', 35', Walker 19' | 2,411 | |
| 8 December 2012 | 15th | Plymouth Argyle | A | L | 0–2 | | 5,881 | |
| 15 December 2012 | 14th | Bristol Rovers | H | W | 4–1 | Kenneth 14' o.g., Chambers (2) 16', 33', Walker 19' | 3,109 | |
| 26 December 2012 | 15th | Chesterfield | A | L | 0–3 | | 7,322 | |
| 29 December 2012 | 16th | Fleetwood Town | A | D | 0–0 | | 2,465 | |
| 1 January 2013 | 14th | Burton Albion | H | W | 3–0 | Walker 13' pen., McLaughlin 36', Blair 81' | 3,863 | |
| 5 January 2013 | 15th | Exeter City | H | L | 1–2 | Potts 19' | 3,506 | |
| 12 January 2013 | 15th | Cheltenham Town | A | D | 1–1 | Walker 84' | 2,881 | |
| 19 January 2013 | 15th | Aldershot Town | H | D | 0–0 | | 2,757 | |
| 26 January 2013 | 15th | Gillingham | A | D | 1–1 | McLaughlin 17' | 4,893 | |
| 2 February 2013 | 17th | Morecambe | H | L | 1–4 | Walker 28' pen. | 3,138 | |
| 9 February 2013 | 18th | Wycombe Wanderers | A | L | 0–4 | | 3,383 | |
| 12 February 2013 | 17th | Gillingham | H | D | 0–0 | | 2,699 | |
| 16 February 2013 | 17th | Barnet | H | L | 1–2 | Stephens 7' o.g. | 3,594 | |
| 23 February 2013 | 17th | Oxford United | A | D | 0–0 | | 5,808 | |
| 26 February 2013 | 17th | Rotherham United | A | D | 1–1 | Blair 63' | 7,666 | |
| 2 March 2013 | 18th | Bradford City | H | L | 0–2 | | 5,678 | |
| 9 March 2013 | 19th | AFC Wimbledon | A | L | 2–3 | C. Smith (2) 29', 72' | 4,349 | |
| 12 March 2013 | 19th | Rochdale | H | D | 0–0 | | 2,929 | |
| 16 March 2013 | 19th | Port Vale | H | L | 0–2 | | 3,945 | |
| 23 March 2013 | 23rd | Torquay United | A | L | 1–2 | Cresswell 73' pen. | 2,871 | |
| 30 March 2013 | 23rd | Bristol Rovers | A | D | 0–0 | | 7,378 | |
| 1 April 2013 | 23rd | Plymouth Argyle | H | W | 2–0 | Chambers 20', Cresswell 29' | 4,682 | |
| 6 April 2013 | 23rd | Accrington Stanley | H | D | 1–1 | A. Reed 45+1' | 4,446 | |
| 13 April 2013 | 20th | Northampton Town | A | W | 2–0 | Chambers 7', Johnson 85' o.g. | 6,608 | |
| 20 April 2013 | 20th | Southend United | H | W | 2–1 | A. Reed 1', Blair 41' | 5,975 | |
| 27 April 2013 | 17th | Dagenham & Redbridge | A | W | 1–0 | C. Smith 68' | 3,781 | |

=== League table (part) ===
Final League Two table (part)
| Pos | Club | Pld | W | D | L | F | A | GD | Pts |
|---|---|---|---|---|---|---|---|---|---|
| 15th | Wycombe Wanderers | 46 | 17 | 9 | 20 | 50 | 60 | −10 | 60 |
| 16th | Morecambe | 46 | 15 | 13 | 18 | 55 | 61 | −6 | 58 |
| 17th | York City | 46 | 12 | 19 | 15 | 50 | 60 | −10 | 55 |
| 18th | Accrington Stanley | 46 | 14 | 12 | 20 | 51 | 68 | −17 | 54 |
| 19th | Torquay United | 46 | 13 | 14 | 19 | 55 | 62 | −7 | 53 |
| Key | Pos = League position; Pld = Matches played; W = Matches won; D = Matches drawn; L = Matches lost; F = Goals for; A = Goals against; GD = Goal difference; Pts = Points | | | | | | | | |
| Source | | | | | | | | | |

=== FA Cup ===
FA Cup match details
| Round | Date | Opponents | Venue | Result | Score F–A | Scorers | Attendance | Ref. |
|---|---|---|---|---|---|---|---|---|
| First round | 3 November 2012 | AFC Wimbledon | H | D | 1–1 | J. Reed 62' | 2,752 | |
| First round replay | 12 November 2012 | AFC Wimbledon | A | L | 3–4 | Brown 22' o.g., J. Reed (2) 90', 119' | 1,954 | |

=== League Cup ===
League Cup match details
| Round | Date | Opponents | Venue | Result | Score F–A | Scorers | Attendance | Ref. |
|---|---|---|---|---|---|---|---|---|
| First round | 11 August 2012 | Doncaster Rovers | A | D | 1–1 a.e.t. 2–4 pens. | Coulson 65' | 4,937 | |

=== Football League Trophy ===
Football League Trophy match details
| Round | Date | Opponents | Venue | Result | Score F–A | Scorers | Attendance | Ref. |
|---|---|---|---|---|---|---|---|---|
| First round | 4 September 2012 | Rotherham United | A | W | 1–0 | Blair 80' | 3,975 | |
| Second round | 9 October 2012 | Coventry City | H | L | 0–4 | | 2,771 | |

== Transfers ==
=== In ===
| Date | Player | Club† | Fee | Ref. |
|---|---|---|---|---|
| 7 June 2012 | Lee Bullock | (Bradford City) | Free | |
| 26 June 2012 | Oli Johnson | (Oxford United) | Free | |
| 29 June 2012 | Michael Coulson | (Grimsby Town) | Free | |
| 29 June 2012 | John McReady | Darlington 1883 | Undisclosed | |
| 2 July 2012 | Danny Blanchett | (Burton Albion) | Free | |
| 21 July 2012 | Jonathan Smith | Swindon Town | Free | |
| 30 August 2012 | Clarke Carlisle | (Burnley) | Free | |
| 30 August 2012 | Scott Dobie | (St Johnstone) | Free | |
| 15 January 2013 | Ben Everson | (Breiðablik) | Free | |
| 24 January 2013 | Jameel Ible | Salford City | Free | |
| 29 January 2013 | David McDaid | (Derry City) | Compensation | |

† Brackets around club names denote the player's contract with that club had expired before he joined York.

=== Out ===
| Date | Player | Club† | Fee | Ref. |
|---|---|---|---|---|
| 28 September 2012 | Scott Dobie | | Released | |
| 1 January 2013 | Jonathan Smith | Luton Town | £50,000 | |
| 4 January 2013 | Clarke Carlisle | (Northampton Town) | Free | |
| 4 January 2013 | Liam Henderson | (Gateshead) | Released | |
| 24 January 2013 | Danny Blanchett | (Cambridge City) | Released | |
| 28 February 2013 | Oli Johnson | (Guiseley) | Released | |
| 4 March 2013 | Paul Musselwhite | | Released | |
| 26 March 2013 | Jameel Ible | (Guiseley) | Released | |
| 29 April 2013 | Jason Walker | (Östersunds FK) | Released | |
| 30 April 2013 | Lee Bullock | (Whitby Town) | Released | |
| 30 April 2013 | Jon Challinor | (Stamford) | Released | |
| 30 April 2013 | Chris Doig | (Grimsby Town) | Released | |
| 30 April 2013 | Ben Everson | (BÍ/Bolungarvík) | Released | |
| 30 April 2013 | Scott Kerr | (Grimsby Town) | Released | |
| 30 April 2013 | Paddy McLaughlin | (Grimsby Town) | Released | |
| 30 April 2013 | Michael Potts | (Guiseley) | Released | |
| 30 April 2013 | Jamie Reed | (Chester) | Released | |
| 13 May 2013 | Matty Blair | (Fleetwood Town) | Free | |
| 25 June 2013 | David McDaid | (Derry City) | Released | |

† Brackets around club names denote the player joined that club after his York contract expired.

=== Loans in ===
| Date | Player | Club | Return | Ref. |
|---|---|---|---|---|
| 30 August 2012 | Charlie Taylor | Leeds United | Terminated early 26 October 2012 | |
| 4 October 2012 | Daniel Kearns | Peterborough United | Recalled 29 November 2012 | |
| 7 November 2012 | Alex Rodman | Aldershot Town | Terminated early 4 April 2013 | |
| 24 January 2013 | Jack O'Connell | Blackburn Rovers | End of season | |
| 30 January 2013 | Curtis Obeng | Swansea City | 28 February 2013 | |
| 12 February 2013 | John McGrath | Burton Albion | Terminated early 4 April 2013 | |
| 12 February 2013 | Michael Rankine | Aldershot Town | Terminated early 4 April 2013 | |
| 7 March 2013 | Arron Jameson | Sheffield Wednesday | End of season | |
| 14 March 2013 | Josh Carson | Ipswich Town | 15 April 2013 | |
| 19 March 2013 | Richard Cresswell | Sheffield United | Recalled 15 April 2013 | |
| 26 March 2013 | Adam Reed | Sunderland | End of season | |

=== Loans out ===
| Date | Player | Club | Return | Ref. |
|---|---|---|---|---|
| 27 September 2012 | Tom Platt | Harrogate Town | 27 December 2012 | |
| 28 September 2012 | Liam Henderson | Gainsborough Trinity | 28 October 2012 | |
| 25 October 2012 | Lee Bullock | Gateshead | Recalled 14 December 2012 | |
| 5 November 2012 | Jonathan Smith | Luton Town | Recalled 11 December 2012 | |
| 19 November 2012 | Clarke Carlisle | Northampton Town | Made permanent 4 January 2013 | |
| 22 November 2012 | Liam Henderson | Gateshead | 2 January 2013 | |
| 17 January 2013 | Tom Platt | FC Halifax Town | 19 February 2013 | |
| 11 February 2013 | Jamie Reed | Cambridge United | 11 March 2013 | |
| 21 February 2013 | Ben Everson | Gateshead | End of season | |
| 2 February 2013 | Tom Platt | Harrogate Town | 21 March 2013 | |
| 15 March 2013 | Lee Bullock | Stockport County | End of season | |

== Appearances and goals ==
Numbers in parentheses denote appearances as substitute.
Players with names struck through and marked † left the club during the playing season.
Players with names in italics and marked * were on loan from another club for the whole of their season with York.
Players listed with no appearances have been in the matchday squad but only as unused substitutes.
Key to positions: GK – Goalkeeper; DF – Defender; MF – Midfielder; FW – Forward

Players included in matchday squads
| No. | Pos. | Nat. | Name | League | | FA Cup | | League Cup | | FL Trophy | | Total | | Discipline | |
| No. | Pos. | Nat. | Name | Apps | Goals | Apps | Goals | Apps | Goals | Apps | Goals | Apps | Goals | A yellow rectangle, denoting the yellow penalty card shown to a player being cautioned | A red rectangle, denoting the red penalty card shown to a player being sent off |
|---|---|---|---|---|---|---|---|---|---|---|---|---|---|---|---|
| 1 | GK | ENG | ~~Paul Musselwhite~~ † | 0 | 0 | 0 | 0 | 0 | 0 | 0 | 0 | 0 | 0 | 0 | 0 |
| 1 | GK | ENG | Arron Jameson * | 0 | 0 | 0 | 0 | 0 | 0 | 0 | 0 | 0 | 0 | 0 | 0 |
| 2 | DF | IRL | Lanre Oyebanjo | 22 (8) | 0 | 1 | 0 | 0 | 0 | 1 | 0 | 24 (8) | 0 | 2 | 0 |
| 3 | DF | ENG | ~~Danny Blanchett~~ † | 2 (2) | 0 | 0 | 0 | 0 | 0 | 0 | 0 | 2 (2) | 0 | 0 | 0 |
| 4 | DF | ENG | Chris Smith | 45 | 4 | 2 | 0 | 1 | 0 | 2 | 0 | 50 | 4 | 5 | 0 |
| 5 | DF | ENG | David McGurk | 11 | 0 | 0 | 0 | 0 | 0 | 0 | 0 | 11 | 0 | 2 | 0 |
| 6 | DF | WAL | Daniel Parslow | 44 (1) | 1 | 2 | 0 | 1 | 0 | 1 (1) | 0 | 48 (2) | 1 | 2 | 0 |
| 7 | FW | WAL | Jamie Reed | 4 (12) | 1 | 0 (2) | 3 | 0 | 0 | 0 (1) | 0 | 4 (15) | 4 | 0 | 0 |
| 8 | MF | ENG | Scott Kerr | 26 (2) | 0 | 2 | 0 | 0 | 0 | 1 | 0 | 29 (2) | 0 | 4 | 1 |
| 9 | FW | ENG | Jason Walker | 36 (7) | 9 | 2 | 0 | 1 | 0 | 2 | 0 | 41 (7) | 9 | 1 | 0 |
| 10 | FW | ENG | Ashley Chambers | 36 (2) | 10 | 2 | 0 | 1 | 0 | 1 | 0 | 40 (2) | 10 | 5 | 0 |
| 11 | FW | ENG | Michael Coulson | 13 (6) | 4 | 0 | 0 | 1 | 1 | 1 | 0 | 15 (6) | 5 | 2 | 0 |
| 12 | MF | ENG | Lee Bullock | 1 (11) | 0 | 0 | 0 | 1 | 0 | 0 | 0 | 2 (11) | 0 | 0 | 0 |
| 13 | MF | ENG | ~~Jonathan Smith~~ † | 8 (4) | 0 | 0 | 0 | 1 | 0 | 1 | 0 | 10 (4) | 0 | 1 | 0 |
| 13 | FW | NIR | David McDaid | 0 (4) | 0 | 0 | 0 | 0 | 0 | 0 | 0 | 0 (4) | 0 | 0 | 0 |
| 14 | FW | ENG | ~~Oli Johnson~~ † | 0 (4) | 0 | 0 (2) | 0 | 0 | 0 | 1 | 0 | 1 (6) | 0 | 1 | 0 |
| 14 | MF | NIR | ~~Josh Carson~~ * † | 5 | 0 | 0 | 0 | 0 | 0 | 0 | 0 | 5 | 0 | 1 | 0 |
| 15 | MF | ENG | John McReady | 0 (4) | 0 | 0 | 0 | 0 | 0 | 0 | 0 | 0 (4) | 0 | 0 | 0 |
| 16 | DF | ENG | Jamal Fyfield | 29 (4) | 0 | 2 | 0 | 1 | 0 | 1 | 0 | 33 (4) | 0 | 4 | 0 |
| 17 | MF | ENG | Matty Blair | 35 (9) | 6 | 2 | 0 | 0 (1) | 0 | 2 | 1 | 39 (10) | 7 | 2 | 0 |
| 18 | MF | ENG | Tom Platt | 6 (1) | 0 | 0 | 0 | 0 | 0 | 0 | 0 | 6 (1) | 0 | 2 | 0 |
| 19 | MF | ENG | Michael Potts | 12 (1) | 3 | 0 | 0 | 0 (1) | 0 | 0 | 0 | 12 (2) | 3 | 2 | 0 |
| 20 | MF | ENG | Jon Challinor | 5 (14) | 0 | 0 | 0 | 0 (1) | 0 | 1 (1) | 0 | 6 (16) | 0 | 3 | 0 |
| 21 | FW | ENG | Liam Henderson | 0 | 0 | 0 | 0 | 0 | 0 | 0 | 0 | 0 | 0 | 0 | 0 |
| 21 | FW | ENG | Ben Everson | 0 (2) | 0 | 0 | 0 | 0 | 0 | 0 | 0 | 0 (2) | 0 | 0 | 0 |
| 22 | DF | ENG | ~~Clarke Carlisle~~ † | 10 | 0 | 2 | 0 | 0 | 0 | 1 (1) | 0 | 13 (1) | 0 | 1 | 0 |
| 22 | DF | ENG | Jack O'Connell * | 18 | 0 | 0 | 0 | 0 | 0 | 0 | 0 | 18 | 0 | 2 | 0 |
| 23 | DF | SCO | Chris Doig | 13 (1) | 0 | 0 | 0 | 1 | 0 | 1 | 0 | 15 (1) | 0 | 1 | 0 |
| 24 | GK | NIR | Michael Ingham | 46 | 0 | 2 | 0 | 1 | 0 | 2 | 0 | 51 | 0 | 4 | 0 |
| 25 | FW | ENG | ~~Michael Rankine~~ * † | 5 (3) | 0 | 0 | 0 | 0 | 0 | 0 | 0 | 5 (3) | 0 | 0 | 0 |
| 26 | MF | NIR | Paddy McLaughlin | 26 (4) | 4 | 1 | 0 | 1 | 0 | 1 | 0 | 29 (4) | 4 | 2 | 0 |
| 27 | DF | ENG | ~~Charlie Taylor~~ * † | 3 (1) | 0 | 0 | 0 | 0 | 0 | 1 | 0 | 4 (1) | 0 | 0 | 0 |
| 27 | DF | ENG | Tom Allan | 1 (4) | 0 | 0 | 0 | 0 | 0 | 0 | 0 | 1 (4) | 0 | 0 | 0 |
| 28 | MF | IRL | ~~Daniel Kearns~~ * † | 8 (1) | 0 | 2 | 0 | 0 | 0 | 1 | 0 | 11 (1) | 0 | 0 | 0 |
| 29 | MF | ENG | Reece Kelly | 0 | 0 | 0 | 0 | 0 | 0 | 0 | 0 | 0 | 0 | 0 | 0 |
| 29 | MF | IRL | ~~John McGrath~~ * † | 9 | 0 | 0 | 0 | 0 | 0 | 0 | 0 | 9 | 0 | 0 | 0 |
| 32 | DF | ENG | ~~Curtis Obeng~~ * † | 4 | 0 | 0 | 0 | 0 | 0 | 0 | 0 | 4 | 0 | 0 | 0 |
| 33 | FW | ENG | ~~Alex Rodman~~ * † | 12 (6) | 1 | 0 | 0 | 0 | 0 | 0 | 0 | 12 (6) | 1 | 1 | 0 |
| 35 | FW | ENG | ~~Richard Cresswell~~ * † | 5 | 2 | 0 | 0 | 0 | 0 | 0 | 0 | 5 | 2 | 1 | 0 |
| 37 | MF | ENG | Adam Reed * | 6 | 2 | 0 | 0 | 0 | 0 | 0 | 0 | 6 | 2 | 1 | 0 |

Players not included in matchday squads
| No. | Pos. | Nat. | Name |
|---|---|---|---|
| 25 | FW | SCO | ~~Scott Dobie~~ † |
| 25 | FW | ENG | Rob Moncur |
| 28 | DF | ENG | ~~Jameel Ible~~ † |

== See also ==
- List of York City F.C. seasons
