= Tom Platt =

English footballer (born 1993)

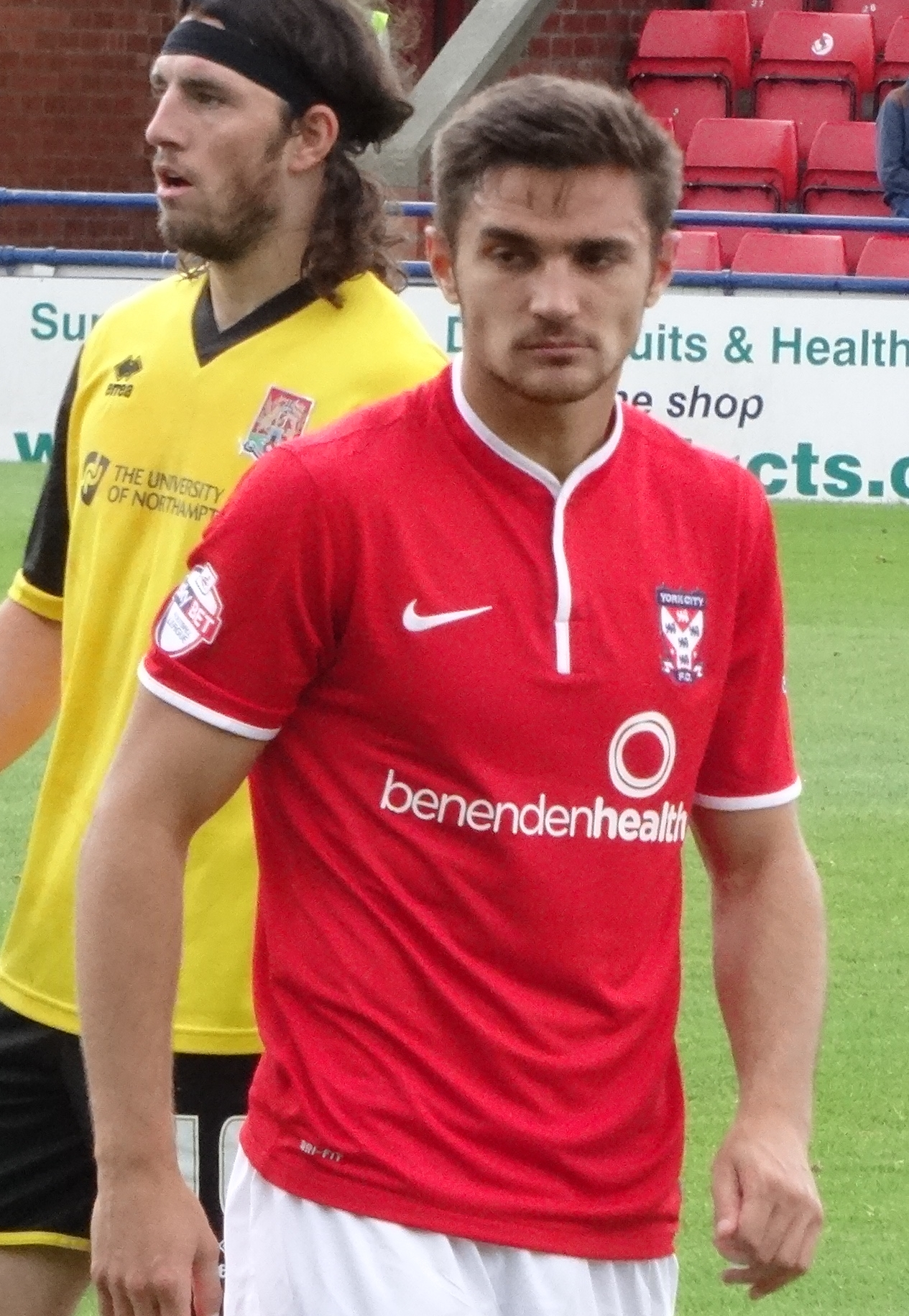
- Platt in 2014

Personal information
- Full name: Thomas Christopher Platt
- Date of birth: 1 October 1993 (age 33)
- Place of birth: Pontefract, England
- Height: 6 ft 1 in (1.86 m)
- Position: Midfielder

Team information
- Current team: Darlington
- Number: 4

Youth career
- Easingwold Town
- 2004–2011: York City

Senior career*
| Years | Team | Apps | (Gls) |
| 2011–2016 | York City | 47 | (0) |
| 2011 | → Hucknall Town (loan) | 1 | (0) |
| 2012 | → Harrogate Town (loan) | 10 | (2) |
| 2012 | → Harrogate Town (loan) | 5 | (4) |
| 2013 | → FC Halifax Town (loan) | 3 | (0) |
| 2013 | → Harrogate Town (loan) | 6 | (3) |
| 2015 | → Harrogate Town (loan) | 6 | (0) |
| 2016 | → Harrogate Town (loan) | 8 | (0) |
| 2016–2017 | Harrogate Town | 36 | (4) |
| 2017–2019 | Alfreton Town | 70 | (9) |
| 2019–2023 | Boston United | 117 | (4) |
| 2023– | Darlington | 106 | (3) |
- * Club domestic league appearances and goals as of 12:38, 28 May 2026 (UTC)

Thomas Christopher Platt (born 1 October 1993) is an English semi-professional footballer who plays as a midfielder for National League North club Darlington.

Platt started his career with York City, progressing through the club's youth system before signing a professional contract in June 2012. He had loan spells with Hucknall Town, Harrogate Town and FC Halifax Town before making his first-team debut with York in March 2013. He rejoined Harrogate on loan in August 2015 and signed for the club permanently in March 2016. Platt was released by Harrogate after the 2016–17 season. He then spent two seasons with Alfreton Town and four with Boston United before joining Darlington in 2023.

== Career ==
=== York City ===
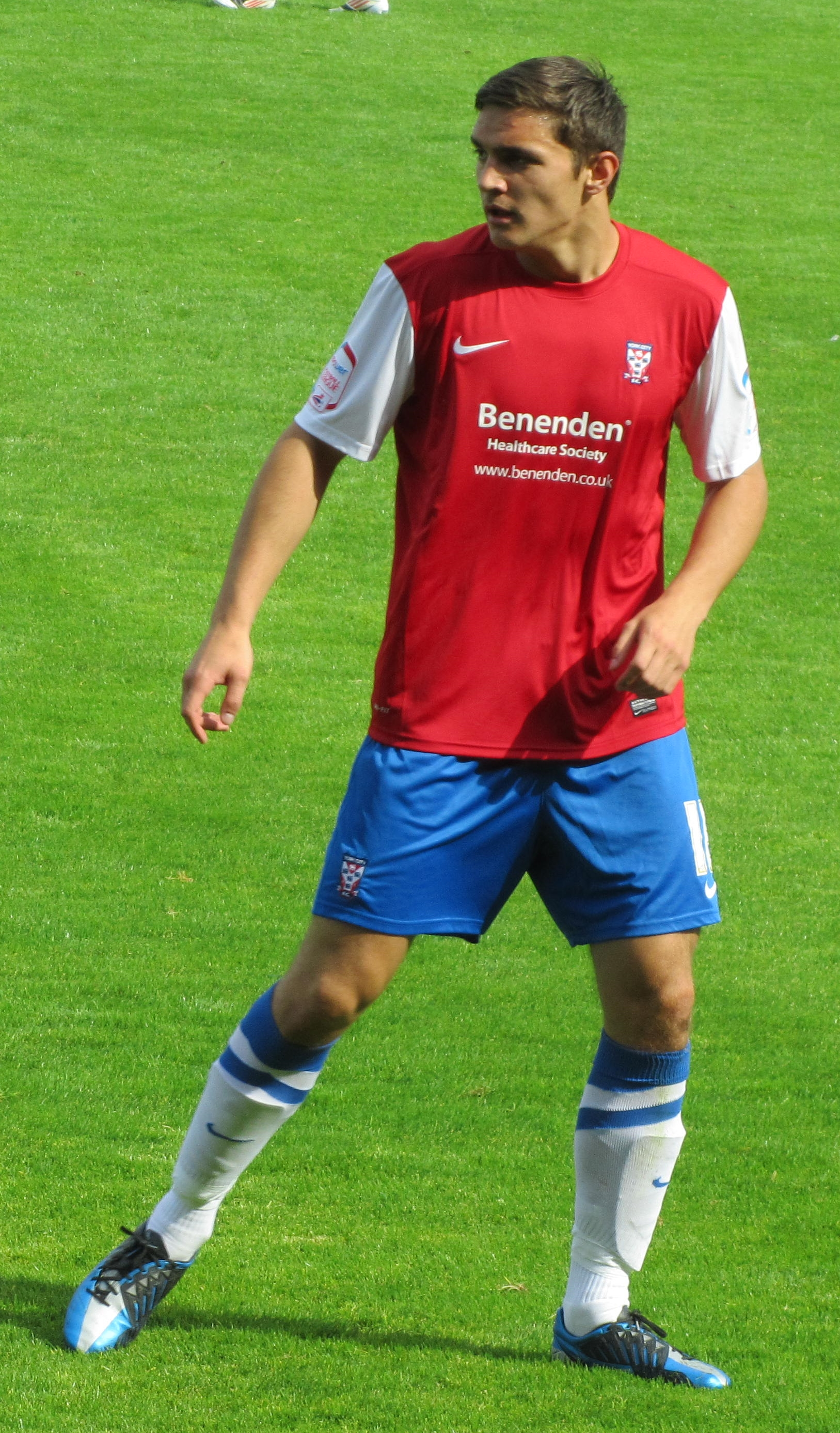
Platt playing for York City in 2012

Born in Pontefract, West Yorkshire, Platt attended Easingwold School and played for Easingwold Town before joining the York City youth system in 2004. He joined Northern Premier League Division One South club Hucknall Town on loan in October 2011, making his only appearance as a substitute against Stamford before returning to York in November. Later in the 2011–12 season, Platt signed for Harrogate Town of the Conference North on loan on 6 March 2012, scoring on his debut later that day with Harrogate's first goal in a 6–2 home win over Corby Town. He finished the loan with two goals in 10 appearances. Following the end of the season he was named York's Youth Team Player of the Year, having captained the under-18 team during the season.

Platt signed a one-year professional contract with York in June 2012, following their promotion to League Two via the Conference Premier play-offs, with manager Gary Mills saying "I have high hopes for him. He's done superbly well. I think he's got a bright future." He rejoined Harrogate on a three-month loan on 27 September 2012, making his second debut for the club two days later in a 2–2 draw at Worcester City. He played in five FA Cup matches for Harrogate, including their matches against Conference Premier team Hyde in the fourth qualifying round and League Two team Torquay United in the first round. He scored in the second round against Hastings United in a 1–1 draw, and scored a 90th-minute equaliser in the replay, although Harrogate lost 5–4 in a penalty shoot-out after a 1–1 extra-time draw. He scored eight goals in 11 appearances before returning to York in December 2012.

Platt signed for another Conference North club, FC Halifax Town, on a one-month loan on 17 January 2013. His debut came in a 5–1 win at Corby Town on 2 February 2013. Having made three appearances for Halifax he returned to Harrogate on 22 February 2013, signing on loan for the rest of 2012–13. Platt marked his return with Harrogate's opening goal in a 2–0 win away to Gloucester City on 23 February 2013.

He was recalled by newly appointed York manager Nigel Worthington on 21 March 2013, having scored three goals in six matches during his third spell with Harrogate. He made his York debut in a 2–1 defeat away to Torquay on 23 March 2013, entering the match as a half-time substitute for Paddy McLaughlin. He then started York's six remaining matches, being paired alongside Adam Reed in midfield, as York went on to avoid relegation on the final day of the 2012–13. Platt's emergence in the team was praised by Worthington as the "biggest highlight" of York's relegation battle, and having finished his first senior season at York with seven appearances signed a new two-year contract with the club in May 2013.

=== Harrogate Town ===
Platt rejoined National League North club Harrogate on a three-month loan on 28 August 2015, and made his debut a day later as a 55th-minute substitute for Paul Thirlwell in a 1–0 away win over Chorley. He made six appearances for Harrogate before being recalled by York on 28 September 2015 after an injury to Luke Summerfield. Platt returned to Harrogate on a one-month loan on 27 January 2016, debuting three days later as a 69th-minute substitute for Brendon Daniels in a 4–3 away defeat to F.C. United of Manchester. Platt joined Harrogate permanently on 24 March 2016, after his contract with York was terminated by mutual consent. At the end of 2016–17, Platt was released by Harrogate.

=== Alfreton Town ===
On 16 June 2017, Platt signed for National League North club Alfreton Town on a one-year contract.

=== Boston United ===
On 15 May 2019, Platt joined Boston United.

=== Darlington ===
Platt moved on to another National League North club, Darlington, in May 2023. He signed a one-year deal with the option for a further year, and was appointed captain. After the dismissal of manager Alun Armstrong and assistant Darren Holloway on 6 September, Platt was one of a group of three senior players tasked with covering managerial duties until an appointment was made. He was almost ever-present throughout the season, and won three player of the year awards, those presented by the away fans, his manager and his fellow players.

== Playing positions ==
Platt primarily plays as a central midfielder and can also play at centre-back.

== Career statistics ==
As of end of 2024–25 season

Appearances and goals by club, season and competition
| Club | Season | League | | | FA Cup | | League Cup | | Other | | Total | |
| Club | Season | Division | Apps | Goals | Apps | Goals | Apps | Goals | Apps | Goals | Apps | Goals |
|---|---|---|---|---|---|---|---|---|---|---|---|---|
| York City | 2011–12 | Conference Premier | 0 | 0 | — | | — | | 0 | 0 | 0 | 0 |
| York City | 2012–13 | League Two | 7 | 0 | — | | 0 | 0 | 0 | 0 | 7 | 0 |
| York City | 2013–14 | League Two | 20 | 0 | 1 | 0 | 1 | 0 | 1 (Note: Appearance in Football League Trophy) | 0 | 23 | 0 |
| York City | 2014–15 | League Two | 20 | 0 | 1 | 0 | 1 | 0 | 0 | 0 | 22 | 0 |
| York City | 2015–16 | League Two | 0 | 0 | 0 | 0 | 0 | 0 | 0 | 0 | 0 | 0 |
| York City | Total | | 47 | 0 | 2 | 0 | 2 | 0 | 1 | 0 | 52 | 0 |
| Hucknall Town (loan) | 2011–12 | Northern Premier League Division One South | 1 | 0 | — | | — | | — | | 1 | 0 |
| Harrogate Town (loan) | 2011–12 | Conference North | 10 | 2 | — | | — | | — | | 10 | 2 |
| Harrogate Town (loan) | 2012–13 | Conference North | 5 | 4 | 6 | 2 | — | | 1 (Note: Appearance in FA Trophy) | 2 | 12 | 8 |
| Harrogate Town (loan) | Total | | 15 | 6 | 6 | 2 | — | | 1 | 2 | 22 | 10 |
| FC Halifax Town (loan) | 2012–13 | Conference North | 3 | 0 | — | | — | | — | | 3 | 0 |
| Harrogate Town (loan) | 2012–13 | Conference North | 6 | 3 | — | | — | | — | | 6 | 3 |
| Harrogate Town | 2015–16 | National League North | 21 | 0 | — | | — | | 1 (Note: Appearance in National League North play-offs) | 0 | 22 | 0 |
| Harrogate Town | 2016–17 | National League North | 29 | 4 | 3 | 0 | — | | 0 | 0 | 32 | 4 |
| Harrogate Town | Total | | 56 | 7 | 3 | 0 | — | | 1 | 0 | 60 | 7 |
| Alfreton Town | 2017–18 | National League North | 38 | 6 | 0 | 0 | — | | 1 | 0 | 39 | 6 |
| Alfreton Town | 2018–19 | National League North | 32 | 3 | 3 | 0 | — | | 1 | 0 | 36 | 3 |
| Alfreton Town | Total | | 70 | 9 | 3 | 0 | — | | 2 | 0 | 75 | 9 |
| Boston United | 2019–20 | National League North | 33 | 2 | 6 | 0 | — | | 0 | 0 | 39 | 2 |
| Boston United | 2020–21 | National League North | 9 | 1 | 1 | 0 | — | | 2 | 0 | 12 | 1 |
| Boston United | 2021–22 | National League North | 38 | 0 | 3 | 0 | — | | 2 | 0 | 43 | 0 |
| Boston United | 2022–23 | National League North | 37 | 1 | 1 | 0 | — | | 1 | 0 | 39 | 1 |
| Boston United | Total | | 117 | 4 | 11 | 0 | — | | 5 | 0 | 133 | 4 |
| Darlington | 2023–24 | National League North | 44 | 0 | 2 | 1 | — | | 1 | 0 | 47 | 1 |
| Darlington | 2024–25 | National League North | 20 | 0 | 0 | 0 | — | | 1 | 0 | 21 | 0 |
| Darlington | Total | | 64 | 0 | 2 | 1 | — | | 2 | 0 | 68 | 1 |
| Career total | | | 373 | 26 | 27 | 3 | 2 | 0 | 12 | 2 | 414 | 31 |
