= Lee Bullock =

English association football player

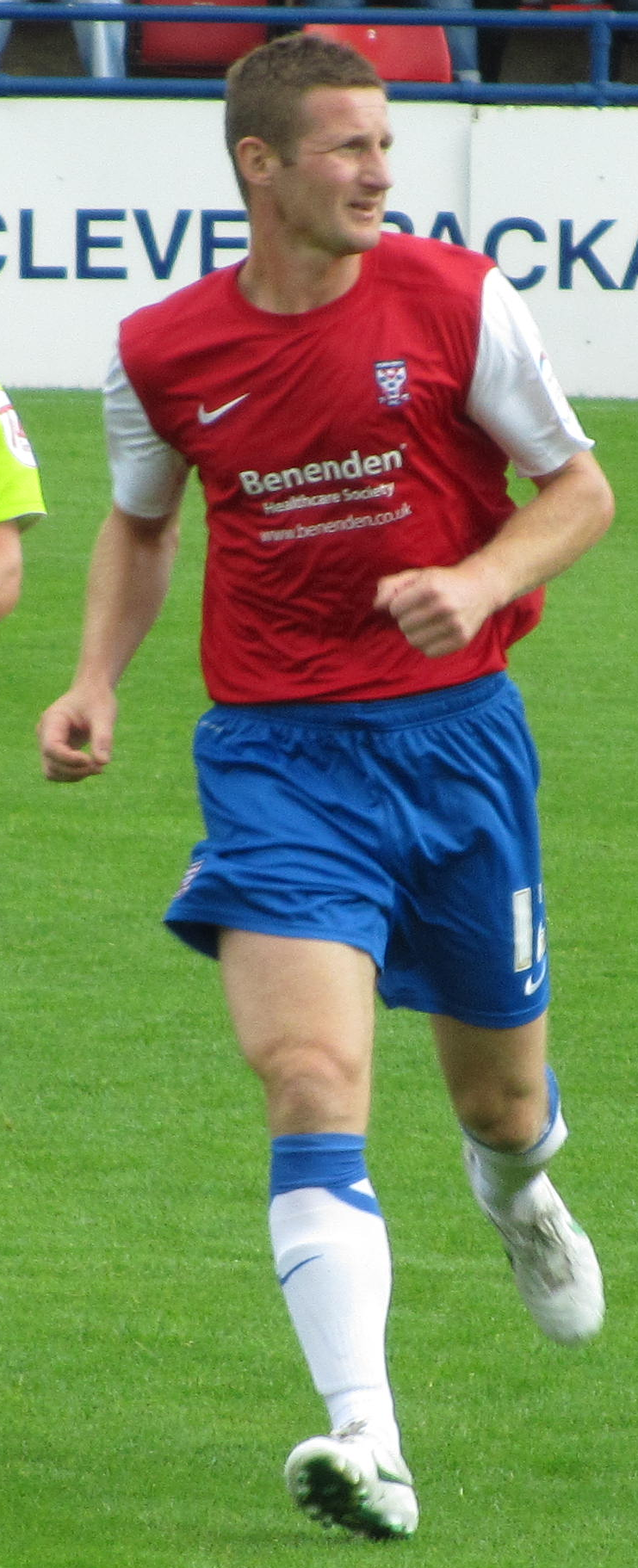
- Bullock playing for York City in 2012

Personal information
- Full name: Lee Bullock
- Date of birth: 22 May 1981 (age 45)
- Place of birth: Stockton-on-Tees, England
- Height: 6 ft 0 in (1.83 m)
- Position: Midfielder

Youth career
- ?–1998: York City

Senior career*
Years	Team	Apps	(Gls)
1998–2004	York City	171	(24)
2004	→ Cardiff City (loan)	10	(3)
2004–2005	Cardiff City	21	(3)
2005–2008	Hartlepool United	57	(5)
2007	→ Mansfield Town (loan)	5	(0)
2007	→ Bury (loan)	8	(0)
2008	→ Bradford City (loan)	5	(0)
2008–2012	Bradford City	115	(5)
2012–2013	York City	12	(0)
2012	→ Gateshead (loan)	7	(0)
2013	→ Stockport County (loan)	9	(0)
2013–2015	Whitby Town	32	(2)

Managerial career
- 2020–2022: Whitby Town (joint-manager)
- 2026: Whitby Town (joint-manager)
- * Club domestic league appearances and goals as of 22:41, 5 March 2014 (UTC)

Lee Bullock (born 22 May 1981) is an English former footballer.

He started his career with York City, with whom he played 171 league games and scored 24 goals, before he moved to First Division side Cardiff City in 2004 after a loan spell. He spent just one season with Cardiff before he returned to north-east England with Hartlepool United. He won promotion from League Two with Hartlepool, but after he lost his place in the side, he had loan spells with Mansfield Town, Bury and Bradford City, before signing permanently for Bradford in January 2008. In 2012 Bullock was released by Bradford and subsequently returned to former club York. He had loan spells with Gateshead and Stockport County before being released by York in 2013. Bullock now works for Cleveland police.

== Career ==
=== York City ===
Bullock started his career with York City, joining the club's youth system at a young age. He made his first team debut on 5 December 1998 in a 2–1 FA Cup second round defeat at Wrexham as a 17-year-old while still a trainee. He was substituted at half-time for Graham Rennison to facilitate a tactical switch after Mark Tinkler was sent off in the first half. He signed a two-year professional contract at the end of the 1998–99 season, which he finished with the club's Young Player of the Year award. He made 17 starts during his first full season and played 25 games in total, but never managed more than six successive appearances. His season had been ended early because of an ankle injury he picked up in a reserve game, but he extended his contract during the summer to three years, keeping him at Bootham Crescent until at least 2003. His first goal came nearly two years after his debut when he scored a header in a 3–1 victory over Halifax Town at The Shay on 24 October 2000. He scored another three goals that season, including another goal against Halifax Town in a 2–1 relegation battle on 14 April 2001. In the 2001–02 season, he more than doubled the number of goals to nine. He underwent an ankle operation in April 2002, which ended his season early after playing 47 games. He scored seven the following season, but at the end of the season, he was one of just eight players to be kept on at the club, because of financial problems. Once again he scored seven goals in 2003–04.

=== Cardiff City ===
Bullock had a trial with First Division Cardiff City in February 2004, and after manager Lennie Lawrence weighed up a move for the player he signed on loan until the end of the season, with a view to a permanent transfer, on 9 March. He scored three goals in 10 games during his loan spell, including one on his debut at home to Reading after turning in a Robert Earnshaw cross 18 minutes from time, although Reading went on to win the game 3–2. His third goal came in a 1–1 draw with Ipswich Town on the final day of the season on 9 May, after his header from Tony Vidmar's cross deflected off Ipswich's Jermaine Wright. With Cardiff still to decide whether to sign Bullock permanently, a number of clubs made enquiries about his signature.

Bullock joined Cardiff on a permanent deal on 28 June 2004, which would make York £100,000 if he made 25 appearances for Cardiff. He finished the 2004–05 season with five goals, including two in the League Cup, from 26 appearances, of which eight were league starts.

=== Hartlepool United ===
Bullock became Martin Scott's first signing as Hartlepool United manager after joining the League One club on a free transfer on 30 June 2005. He made his Hartlepool debut on the opening day of the 2005–06 season in a 2–0 loss to Bradford City, before he scored three days later in a 1–1 draw with AFC Bournemouth. He scored four goals in his first season, but missed two months from November to January 2006 because of a thigh strain and then a hand injury. He had his lowest scoring season in 2006–07, netting just twice in 31 games, but helped Hartlepool to promotion as League Two runners-up.

Bullock signed for League Two Mansfield Town on a one-month loan on 30 August 2007 to play regular first team football, having failed to appear for Hartlepool by that point in 2007–08. He returned to Hartlepool in September after no extension was agreed, having played five games for Mansfield. He signed for Bury of League Two on a one-month loan on 5 October. This loan was extended for a second month in November, but he returned to Hartlepool in December after he turned down a permanent deal with Bury. Bullock finished the loan spell with eight appearances.

=== Bradford City ===
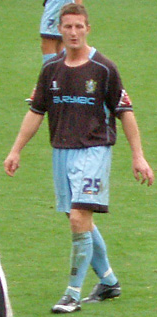
Bullock playing for Bury in 2007

He joined League Two Bradford City on a one-month loan on 31 December, which started in January 2008. He made his Bradford debut in a 2–0 victory against Accrington Stanley on 1 January. Three games into his loan spell at Bradford, he was transfer listed by Hartlepool. Bradford were unbeaten during Bullock's five game loan period, winning three and drawing two, and they signed Bullock on an 18-month contract on 30 January. His first goal for Bradford was the side's third in a 3–2 victory over Rotherham United on 26 February 2008. Bullock played for a month with a groin injury, and after playing 12 consecutive games since he first joined Bradford, he was rested for a game at Chester City on 12 March 2008 before undergoing a hernia operation, which kept him out for the rest of the 2007–08 season. He made 12 appearances and scored one goal for Bradford that season.

Bullock returned to the Bradford side on the opening day of the 2008–09 season against Notts County, with Bradford winning 2–1 at home. Bullock scored in consecutive league games as Bradford won four of their first six games, but strained the medial ligament in his knee in a game at Shrewsbury Town on 27 September. He returned to action after three months out injured when he played the first half of a reserve game against his former side Hartlepool on 16 December. His return to first team action came more than a month later on 24 January 2009, when he was a 77th-minute substitute for fellow midfielder Dean Furman in a 3–3 draw at Luton Town, before he made his first start for four months three days later in a 1–0 defeat away to his former side Bury. After finishing his first full Bradford season with three goals in 24 games he was offered a new one-year contract by the club and, despite it necessitating a wage cut, he agreed to it in June.

After finishing the 2009–10 season with 45 appearances and one goal and being named the club's Players' Player of the Year, Bullock signed a new two-year contract with Bradford on 9 June 2010. He was released by the club on 12 May 2012 having made 20 appearances in the 2011–12 season.

=== Return to York City ===
Bullock returned to York City, the club where he started his career, after signing a one-year contract with the newly promoted League Two side on 7 June 2012. He made his second York debut after starting the game away at League One Doncaster Rovers in the League Cup first round on 11 August 2012, which the side lost 4–2 in a penalty shoot-out following a 1–1 draw after extra time. He then played in York's first Football League fixture since their promotion, a 3–1 defeat at home to Wycombe Wanderers on 18 August 2012. Having been limited to seven appearances for York, Bullock joined Conference Premier side Gateshead on a one-month emergency loan on 25 October 2012. He made his debut for Gateshead two days later in a 1–1 draw against Kidderminster Harriers at Aggborough. On 22 November 2012, the loan was extended until 2 January 2013. He scored his first goal for Gateshead the following day with a 12-yard header in a 2–0 home win against Macclesfield Town in the FA Trophy. Having made eight appearances and scored one goal for Gateshead, Bullock was recalled by York on 14 December 2012. Bullock was loaned out again on 15 March 2013, joining Conference Premier side Stockport County for the rest of the season. He made his debut the following day in a 3–1 defeat at home to Braintree Town, and went on to make nine appearances for Stockport as they were relegated to the Conference North. Having made 13 appearances in his second spell with York, Bullock was released by the club on 30 April 2013.

=== Whitby Town ===
Bullock signed for Northern Premier League Premier Division side Whitby Town in July 2013.

== Coaching career ==
In September 2022, Bullock resigned from his role as joint-manager of Whitby Town having held the role since 2020 and previously having served as assistant manager.

On February 9 2024, Bullock was appointed First Team Coach at Redcar Athletic.

On February 10 2026, Bullock returned to Whitby Town as joint manager.

== Personal life ==
Born in Stockton-on-Tees, County Durham, Bullock is a Middlesbrough supporter and attended the club's League Cup final appearance in 2004 when they defeated Bolton Wanderers 2–1.

In 2023, Lee Bullock super fan Benjamin Fellows had a tattoo of Bullock commissioned to celebrate winning the young lawyer of the year award.

He married in the summer of 2009 before honeymooning in the Maldives.

== Career statistics ==
As of match played 1 March 2014.

Club statistics
Club	Season	League			FA Cup		League Cup		Other		Total	
Club	Season	Division	Apps	Goals	Apps	Goals	Apps	Goals	Apps	Goals	Apps	Goals
York City	1998–99	Second Division	0	0	1	0	0	0	0	0	1	0
York City	1999–2000	Third Division	24	0	0	0	1	0	0	0	25	0
York City	2000–01	Third Division	33	3	2	1	2	0	0	0	37	4
York City	2001–02	Third Division	40	8	6	0	1	1	0	0	47	9
York City	2002–03	Third Division	39	6	2	1	1	0	0	0	42	7
York City	2003–04	Third Division	35	7	1	0	1	0	0	0	37	7
York City	Total		171	24	12	2	6	1	0	0	189	27
Cardiff City (loan)	2003–04	First Division	10	3	0	0	0	0	—		10	3
Cardiff City	2004–05	Championship	21	3	1	0	4	2	—		26	5
Cardiff City	Total		31	6	1	0	4	2	—		36	8
Hartlepool United	2005–06	League One	31	4	1	0	1	0	1 (Note: Appearance(s) in Football League Trophy)	0	34	4
Hartlepool United	2006–07	League Two	25	1	2	0	2	0	2	1	31	2
Hartlepool United	2007–08	League One	1	0	0	0	0	0	0	0	1	0
Hartlepool United	Total		57	5	3	0	3	0	3	1	66	6
Mansfield Town (loan)	2007–08	League Two	5	0	0	0	0	0	0	0	5	0
Bury (loan)	2007–08	League Two	8	0	0	0	0	0	0	0	8	0
Bradford City (loan)	2007–08	League Two	5	0	0	0	0	0	0	0	5	0
Bradford City	2007–08	League Two	7	1	0	0	0	0	0	0	7	1
Bradford City	2008–09	League Two	22	3	0	0	1	0	1	0	24	3
Bradford City	2009–10	League Two	41	1	1	0	1	0	2	0	45	1
Bradford City	2010–11	League Two	26	0	0	0	1	0	1	0	28	0
Bradford City	2011–12	League Two	19	0	1	0	0	0	0	0	20	0
Bradford City	Total		120	5	2	0	3	0	4	0	129	5
York City	2012–13	League Two	12	0	0	0	1	0	0	0	13	0
Gateshead (loan)	2012–13	Conference Premier	7	0	0	0	—		1 (Note: Appearance in FA Trophy)	1	8	1
Stockport County (loan)	2012–13	Conference Premier	9	0	0	0	—		0	0	9	0
Whitby Town	2013–14	NPL Premier Division	32	2	2	0	—		1	0	35	2
Career total			452	42	20	2	17	3	9	2	498	49

== Honours ==
=== Club ===
Hartlepool United

- Football League Two runners-up: 2006–07
