= Michael Potts (footballer) =

English footballer

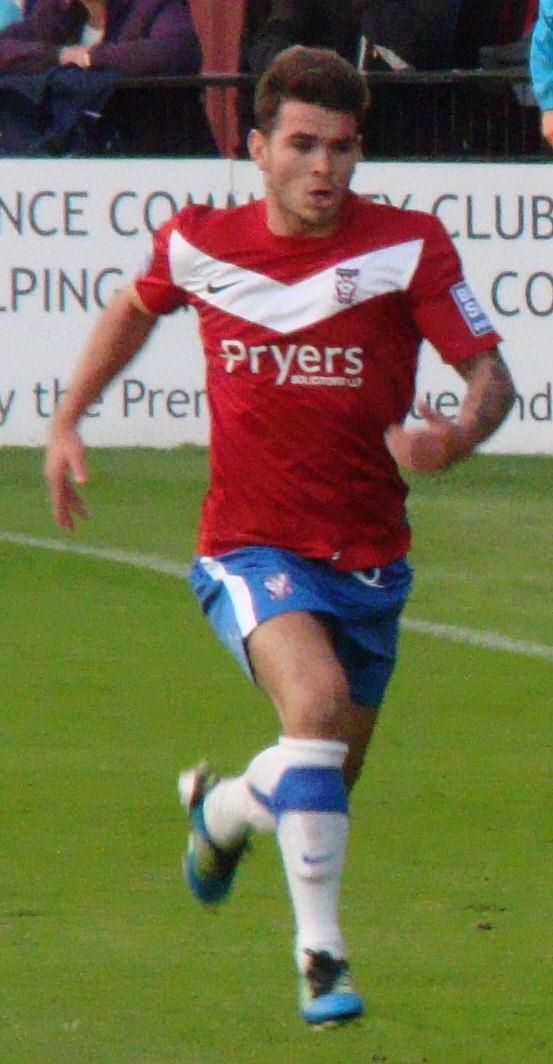
- Potts playing for York City in 2011

Personal information
- Full name: Michael Craig Thomas Potts
- Date of birth: 26 November 1991 (age 34)
- Place of birth: Preston, England
- Height: 5 ft 10 in (1.78 m)
- Position: Midfielder

Team information
- Current team: FC United of Manchester

Youth career
- 1999–2008: Manchester United
- 2008–2010: Blackburn Rovers

Senior career*
Years	Team	Apps	(Gls)
2010–2011	Blackburn Rovers	0	(0)
2011–2013	York City	23	(3)
2013–2014	Guiseley	25	(3)
2014–2015	AFC Fylde	19	(5)
2015	→ Stalybridge Celtic (loan)	15	(0)
2015–2016	Bradford Park Avenue	11	(0)
2016	→ Shaw Lane (loan)		
2016	Curzon Ashton		
2016–2018	Bamber Bridge		
2018–2022	FC United of Manchester		
2022–2023	FC United of Manchester		
2023–	Bamber Bridge		
- * Club domestic league appearances and goals as of 00:19, 19 August 2016 (UTC)

Michael Craig Thomas Potts (born 26 November 1991) is an English semi-professional footballer who plays for FC United of Manchester as a midfielder. He previously played for AFC Fylde, Blackburn Rovers, York City and Guiseley.

== Career ==
=== Early career ===
Born in Preston, Lancashire, Potts played for Manchester United's youth teams all the way through high school. Throughout his time at United Potts was regarded as a striker. Potts attended Priory High School in Penwortham, Preston.

=== Blackburn Rovers ===
After being released at the end of his Youth Contract at Manchester United, Potts signed a contract with Blackburn Rovers in 2008. Although he never played a game for the first team, Potts became well known for his passing ability and had been reverted to a central midfielder.

=== York City ===
Potts signed for Conference Premier side York City on a two-year contract on 23 June 2011. He finished the 2011–12 season with 13 appearances as York were promoted to League Two via the play-offs. He made 14 appearances and scored three goals for York in the 2012–13 season, before being released on 30 April 2013.

=== Guiseley ===
Potts signed for Conference North side Guiseley on 14 August 2013 following a trial. He made 30 appearances and scored three goals in the 2013–14 season.

=== AFC Fylde ===
Potts signed for newly promoted Conference North club AFC Fylde on 20 June 2014.

=== Stalybridge Celtic ===
Potts joined Stalybridge Celtic for a 3-month loan spell on 2 February 2015.

=== Bradford Park Avenue ===
Bradford Park Avenue signed Potts as a free agent 1 June 2015.

=== Curzon Ashton ===
He then joined Curzon Ashton in 2016.

=== Bamber Bridge ===
He joined Bamber Bridge in August 2016.

=== FC United of Manchester ===
Potts joined FC United of Manchester on 26 October 2018. Potts took a break from football at the end of the 2021–22 season. In October 2022, Potts returned to the club.

== Career statistics ==
As of match played 10 May 2014.

Club	Season	League			FA Cup		League Cup		Other		Total	
Club	Season	Division	Apps	Goals	Apps	Goals	Apps	Goals	Apps	Goals	Apps	Goals
York City	2011–12	Conference Premier	10	0	1	0	0	0	2 (Note: One appearance in FA Trophy, one in Conference Premier play-offs)	0	13	0
York City	2012–13	League Two	13	3	0	0	1	0	0	0	14	3
York City	Total		23	3	1	0	1	0	2	0	27	3
Guiseley	2013–14	Conference North	25	3	0	0	—		5 (Note: Two appearances in FA Trophy, three in Conference North play-offs)	0	30	3
Career total			48	6	1	0	1	0	7	0	57	6

== Honours ==
York City

- FA Trophy: 2011–12
