= John McReady =

English footballer

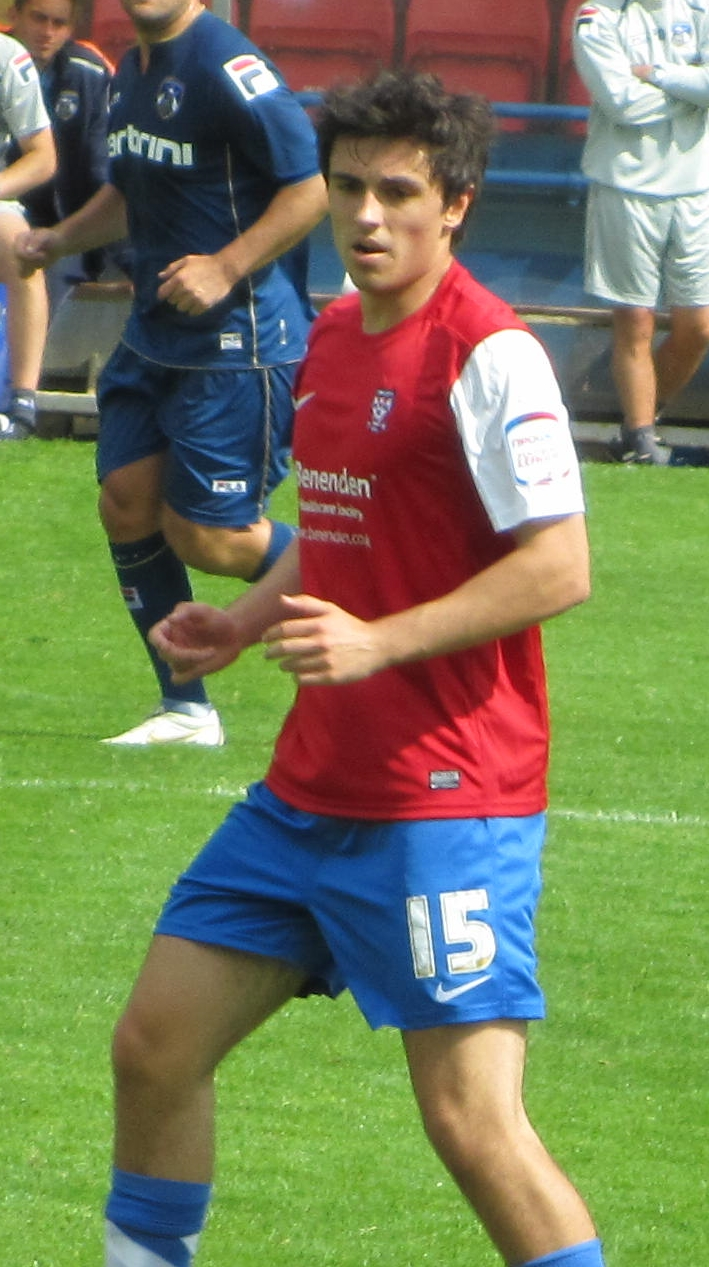
- McReady playing for York City in 2012

Personal information
- Full name: John Lewis McReady
- Date of birth: 24 July 1992 (age 34)
- Place of birth: South Shields, England
- Height: 5 ft 10 in (1.78 m)
- Position: Midfielder

Team information
- Current team: Whitburn & Cleadon FC

Youth career
- 200?–2009: Darlington

Senior career*
Years	Team	Apps	(Gls)
2009–2012	Darlington	56	(3)
2010	→ Billingham Town (loan)		
2010–2011	→ Whitby Town (loan)	6	(0)
2012–2013	York City	4	(0)
2013–2014	FC Halifax Town	14	(0)
2014–2016	Spennymoor Town		
2016–	Whitburn Athletic	2	(1)
- * Club domestic league appearances and goals as of 01:58, 14 December 2016 (UTC)

John Lewis McReady (born 24 July 1992) is an English semi-professional footballer who plays as a midfielder for Northern Football Alliance Division One club Whitburn & Cleadon FC.

McReady started his career with Darlington in their youth system as a 10-year-old, and was first included in the first-team squad during the 2008–09 season. He made his debut towards the end of the following season, and by the end of 2011–12 had established himself in the team. After Darlington were demoted to the Northern League in 2012, McReady signed for York City. He left a year later to sign for FC Halifax Town, and from 2014 to 2016 played for Spennymoor Town

== Career ==
=== Darlington ===
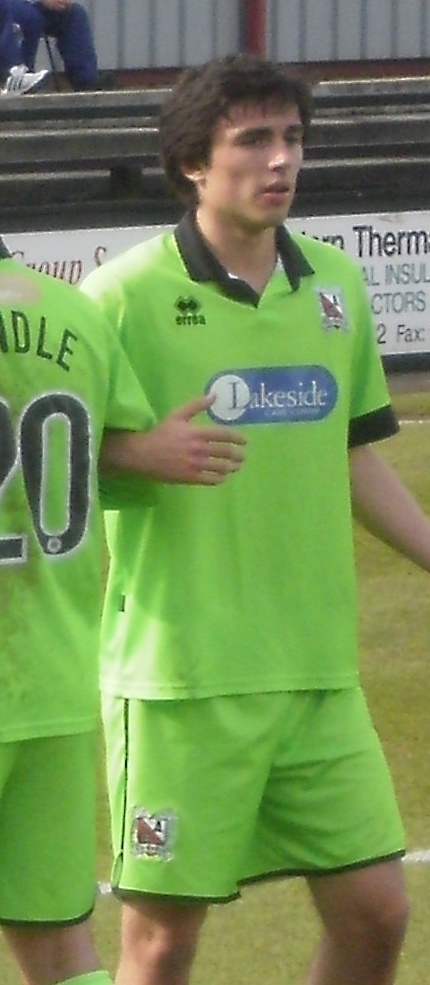
McReady playing for Darlington in 2012

Born in South Shields, Tyne and Wear, McReady joined Darlington's youth system as a 10-year-old. He was first involved in the first-team squad in the 2008–09 season. The following year he spent time on loan at Northern League Division One club Billingham Town, recording an assist on his debut against Esh Winning in January 2010. On his return to Darlington, McReady was named more frequently among the first-team substitutes, and he made his debut at the age of 17 on 24 April 2010 as a half-time substitute, as Darlington lost 2–0 at home to Grimsby Town in League Two. He became the 53rd player to be used by Darlington in 2009–10. McReady made four appearances as Darlington were relegated to the Conference Premier at the end of the season, and in May 2010 he signed a one-year professional contract with the club.

McReady scored his first goal for Darlington on 25 September 2010, with a 93rd-minute winner in a 1–0 home victory over Southport. He joined Whitby Town of the Northern Premier League Premier Division on a one-month loan in November 2010 and debuted in a 2–2 draw with Burscough on 13 November. Despite the loan being extended for the rest of the season, he was recalled by Darlington in February 2011 after making nine appearances for Whitby. McReady was not part of the matchday squad for the club's 2011 FA Trophy victory. He finished 2010–11 with one goal in 15 appearances and signed a new two-year contract with the club in May 2011.

When the club suffered financial difficulties, McReady's contract was terminated on 16 January 2012, along with those of the rest of the playing squad and caretaker manager Craig Liddle, though the club retained their registrations so they were eligible to play on a non-contract basis. He established himself as a first-team regular in 2011–12, making 38 appearances and scoring two goals. McReady stated he intended to remain at Darlington despite the club's relegation from the Conference Premier at the end of the season, but was expected to depart following their demotion to the Northern League.

=== York City ===
McReady signed a two-year contract with newly promoted League Two club York City on 29 June 2012. The club had tried to sign him in the January transfer window. York paid Darlington a small fee to sign him, with discussions being protracted as a result of Darlington's financial problems. After missing York's opening match of 2012–13 against Doncaster Rovers in the League Cup with glandular fever, McReady made his debut as a 69th-minute substitute in a 3–1 defeat at home to Wycombe Wanderers on 18 August 2012, which was the club's first Football League fixture since their promotion. He dislocated his shoulder after entering York's 0–0 home draw with Cheltenham Town on 22 September 2012 as a substitute, and following an operation he was expected to be out injured until the Christmas period. McReady returned from injury in a reserve-team match in the North Riding Senior Cup, scoring twice in a 3–0 home win over Northallerton Town on 8 January 2013. He made only one more first-team appearance that season, as a substitute in a 4–1 home defeat to Morecambe on 2 February 2013, thus finishing the season with four appearances for York.

=== Later career ===
Having failed to make the substitutes' bench for York under Nigel Worthington, McReady was told he had no future with the club, and signed for Conference Premier club FC Halifax Town on 30 August 2013. McReady made his debut the following day in a 3–1 away defeat to Salisbury City, entering the match as an 86th-minute substitute for Matty Pearson. He finished 2013–14 with 14 appearances for Halifax.

McReady signed for newly promoted Northern Premier League Division One North club Spennymoor Town on 3 June 2014. He was released by the club at the end of 2015–16 before signing for Northern Football Alliance Division Two club Whitburn Athletic in July 2016.

== Style of play ==
McReady is an attacking midfielder and has described his style of play as such: "I'm a ball player. I like to attack and get at players – try and create and score goals. I play out wide or in the middle, anywhere across midfield".

== Career statistics ==
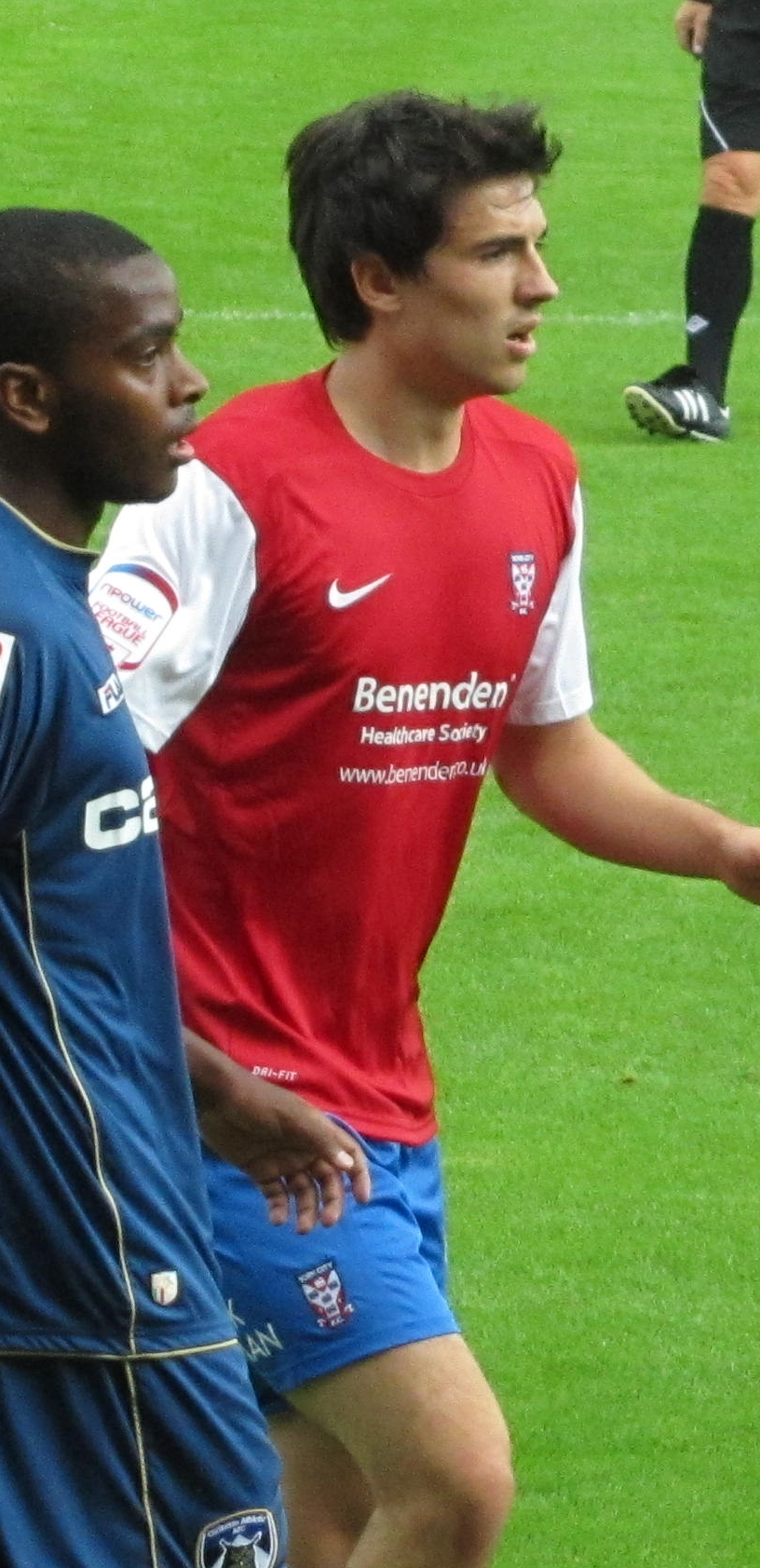
McReady playing for York City in 2012

As of match played 22 October 2016

Appearances and goals by club, season and competition
Club	Season	League			FA Cup		League Cup		Other		Total	
Club	Season	Division	Apps	Goals	Apps	Goals	Apps	Goals	Apps	Goals	Apps	Goals
Darlington	2008–09	League Two	0	0	0	0	0	0	0	0	0	0
Darlington	2009–10	League Two	4	0	0	0	0	0	0	0	4	0
Darlington	2010–11	Conference Premier	15	1	0	0	—		—		15	1
Darlington	2011–12	Conference Premier	37	2	0	0	—		1 (Note: Appearance in FA Trophy)	0	38	2
Darlington	Total		56	3	0	0	0	0	1	0	57	3
Whitby Town (loan)	2010–11	NPL Premier Division	6	0	—		—		3 (Note: Two appearances in FA Trophy, one in Northern Premier League Challenge Cup)	0	9	0
York City	2012–13	League Two	4	0	0	0	0	0	0	0	4	0
York City	2013–14	League Two	0	0	—		0	0	—		0	0
York City	Total		4	0	0	0	0	0	0	0	4	0
FC Halifax Town	2013–14	Conference Premier	14	0	0	0	—		0	0	14	0
Whitburn Athletic	2016–17	Northern Football Alliance Division Two	2	1	—		—		0	0	2	1
Career total			82	4	0	0	0	0	4	0	86	4
