= Paddy McLaughlin (footballer, born 1991) =

Northern Irish association football player

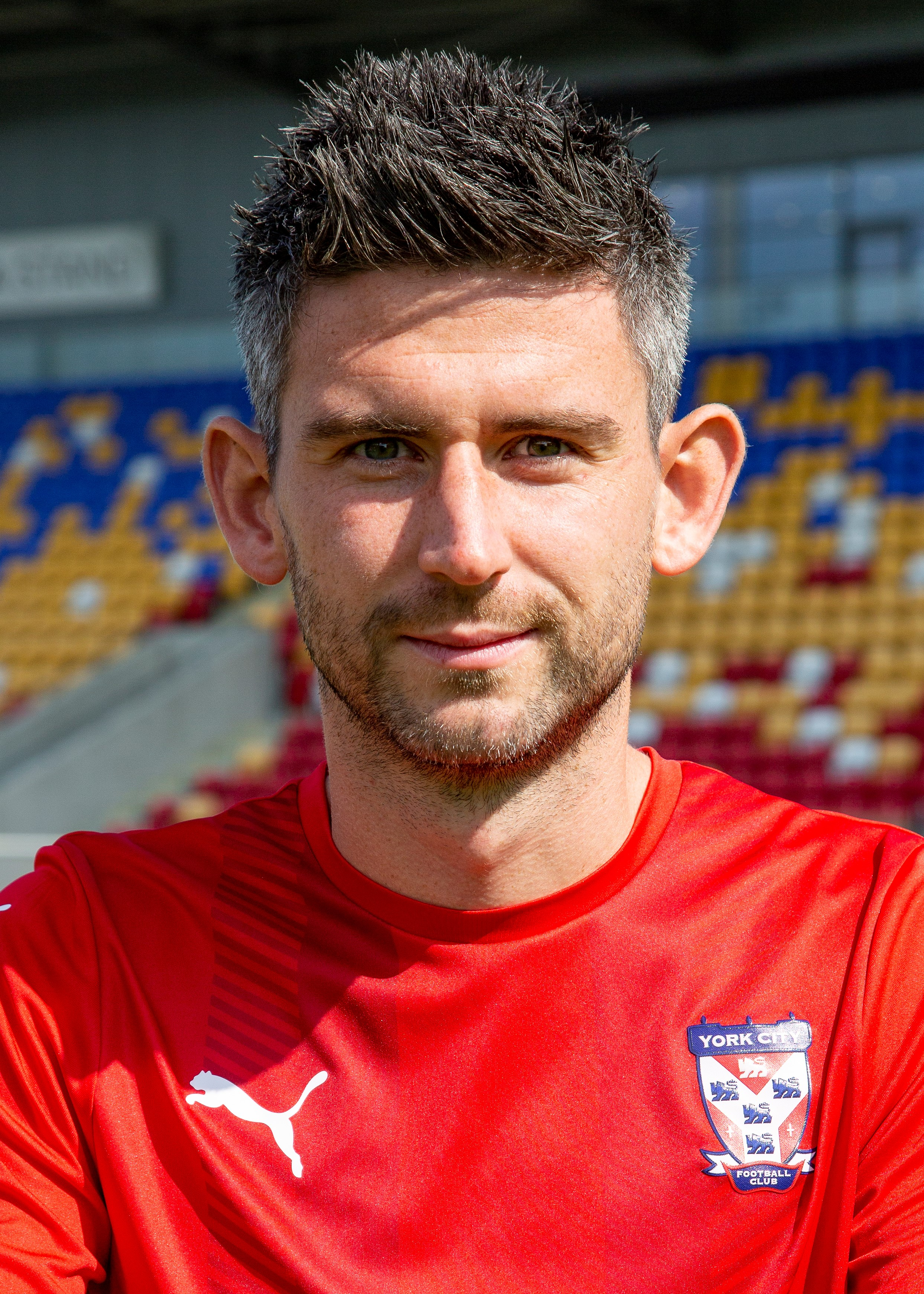
- McLaughlin with York City in 2021

Personal information
- Full name: Patrick Joseph McLaughlin
- Date of birth: 14 January 1991 (age 35)
- Place of birth: Larne, Northern Ireland
- Height: 6 ft 1 in (1.85 m)
- Position: Midfielder

Team information
- Current team: Darlington
- Number: 29

Youth career
- 2007–2008: Newcastle United

Senior career*
Years	Team	Apps	(Gls)
2008–2011	Newcastle United	0	(0)
2011–2013	York City	74	(14)
2013–2015	Grimsby Town	54	(3)
2015	→ Harrogate Town (loan)	4	(1)
2015–2018	Gateshead	125	(12)
2018–2019	Hartlepool United	24	(1)
2019	→ York City (loan)	15	(3)
2019–2026	York City	135	(9)
2022	→ Kidderminster Harriers (loan)	3	(0)
2025–2026	→ Darlington (loan)	26	(0)
2026–	Darlington	4	(3)

International career
2010–2012	Northern Ireland U21	10	(0)
- * Club domestic league appearances and goals as of 20:33, 5 June 2026 (UTC)

Patrick Joseph McLaughlin (born 14 January 1991) is a Northern Irish professional footballer who plays as a midfielder for National League North club Darlington. He has played in the Football League for York City. McLaughlin previously played for Newcastle United, York City, Grimsby Town, Harrogate Town, Gateshead, Hartlepool United and Kidderminster Harriers. He has represented Northern Ireland at levels up to under-21.

== Club career ==
=== Early career ===
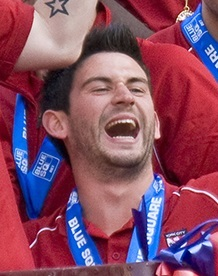
McLaughlin with the victory parade that followed York City's victory in the 2012 Conference Premier play-off final

Born in Larne, County Antrim, McLaughlin began his career at Newcastle United in July 2007. He signed a professional contract a year later but he never played a match at St James' Park. In June 2011, McLaughlin was released by Newcastle after four years at the club.

McLaughlin signed for Conference Premier club York City on 30 June 2011 on a two-year contract. McLaughlin said "I thought York was the best club for me. The gaffer has given me the chance to come down here and play some football." He made his debut for York on the opening day of the 2011–12 season in a 2–1 away win against Ebbsfleet United. McLaughlin started in the York team that beat Newport County 2–0 at Wembley Stadium in the 2012 FA Trophy Final. Eight days later, he came on as an 86th-minute substitute in the 2–1 win over Luton Town in the 2012 Conference Premier play-off final at Wembley Stadium, seeing the club win promotion to League Two after an eight-year absence from the Football League. He finished the season with 55 appearances and scored 13 goals. After making 33 appearances and scoring four goals for York in 2012–13, he was released by the club.

=== Grimsby Town and Gateshead ===
McLaughlin signed for Conference Premier club Grimsby Town on 28 June 2013 on a two-year contract. Following 2013–14, in which he was a regular in the team that was defeated in the semi-final of both the Conference Premier play-offs and the FA Trophy, McLaughlin found himself less involved with the first team during 2014–15. This prompted him to join Conference North club Harrogate Town on loan in March 2015. He was released by Grimsby at the end of the season.

McLaughlin signed for National League club Gateshead on 10 July 2015 on a one-year contract. After scoring 4 goals in 41 appearances during 2015–16, McLaughlin signed a new two-year contract with Gateshead in May 2016.

=== Hartlepool United and York City return ===
McLaughlin signed for Gateshead's National League rivals Hartlepool United on 26 June 2018 on a contract of undisclosed length. He rejoined York City on 23 January 2019 on loan until the end of the 2018–19 season, with the club now in the National League North. He signed for the club permanently on 30 April 2019 on a two-year contract.

On 14 November 2022, McLaughlin signed for Kidderminster Harriers on a month's loan.

On 24 October 2025, McLaughlin joined National League North club Darlington on a one-month loan deal. On 1 December 2025, Darlington confirmed that McLaughlin's loan had been extended until the end of the season.

McLaughlin's playing contract would expire at the end of the 2025/26 season. York confirmed that McLaughlin had been offered a non-playing role at the club after their promotion to EFL League Two.

=== Permanent return to Darlington ===
On 5 June 2026, it was confirmed that McLaughlin would return to National League North club Darlington for the 2026/27 season after impressing on loan from York City the season before. He signed on a free transfer after his playing contract at York expired.

== International career ==
McLaughlin has represented Northern Ireland at various youth levels, up to under-21 level. He earned 10 caps for the under-21 team from 2010 to 2012.

== Career statistics ==
As of match played 25 April 2026

Appearances and goal by club, season and competition
Club	Season	League			FA Cup		League Cup		Other		Total	
Club	Season	Division	Apps	Goals	Apps	Goals	Apps	Goals	Apps	Goals	Apps	Goals
York City	2011–12	Conference Premier	44	10	1	1	—		10 (Note: Seven appearances and two goals in FA Trophy, three appearances in Conference Premier play-offs)	2	55	13
York City	2012–13	League Two	30	4	1	0	1	0	1 (Note: Appearance in Football League Trophy)	0	33	4
York City	Total		74	14	2	1	1	0	11	2	88	17
Grimsby Town	2013–14	Conference Premier	31	3	3	1	—		6 (Note: Appearance(s) in FA Trophy)	1	40	5
Grimsby Town	2014–15	Conference Premier	23	0	1	0	—		2	1	26	1
Grimsby Town	Total		54	3	4	1	—		8	2	66	6
Harrogate Town (loan)	2014–15	Conference North	4	1	—		—		—		4	1
Gateshead	2015–16	National League	35	3	1	0	—		5	1	41	4
Gateshead	2016–17	National League	44	6	2	0	—		1	0	47	6
Gateshead	2017–18	National League	46	3	3	1	—		8	2	57	6
Gateshead	Total		125	12	6	1	—		14	3	145	16
Hartlepool United	2018–19	National League	24	1	3	1	—		2	0	29	2
York City	2018–19	National League North	15	3	—		—		—		15	3
York City	2019–20	National League North	21	1	3	0	—		1 (Note: Appearance in National League North play-offs)	0	25	1
York City	2020–21	National League North	13	1	2	0	—		1	0	16	1
York City	2021–22	National League North	37	5	4	0	—		8	0	49	5
York City	2022–23	National League	18	1	0	0	—		1	0	19	1
York City	2023–24	National League	40	1	3	0	—		0	0	43	1
York City	2024–25	National League	6	0	1	0	—		1	0	8	0
York City	Total		150	12	13	0	—		12	0	175	12
Kidderminster Harriers (loan)	2022–23	National League North	3	0	—		—		—		3	0
Darlington (loan)	2025–26	National League North	26	0	—		—		1	0	27	0
Career total			454	43	27	4	1	0	47	7	529	54

== Honours ==
York City

- FA Trophy: 2011–12
- Conference Premier play-offs: 2012
