= Julani Archibald =

Kittitian footballer (born 1991)

Personal information
- Full name: Julani Kyle Archibald
- Date of birth: 18 May 1991 (age 35)
- Place of birth: Basseterre, St. Kitts and Nevis
- Height: 1.93 m (6 ft 4 in)
- Position: Goalkeeper

Team information
- Current team: Valletta
- Number: 1

Senior career*
Years	Team	Apps	(Gls)
2012–2013	Village Superstars		
2013–2018	W Connection		
2018–2021	Real de Minas	61	(0)
2021–2022	Santa Lucia	13	(0)
2022	Birkirkara	0	(0)
2022–2023	Lorca Deportiva	19	(0)
2023–2024	Victoria	10	(0)
2024–2025	Platense	0	(0)
2025–2026	Village Superstars	0	(0)
2026–	Valletta	0	(0)

International career^{‡}
2011	Saint Kitts and Nevis U23	6	(0)
2008–	Saint Kitts and Nevis	85	(0)
- * Club domestic league appearances and goals as of 22 March 2026 ‡ National team caps and goals as of 17 November 2026

Julani Kyle Archibald (born 18 May 1991) is a Kittitian professional footballer who plays as a goalkeeper for Maltese club Valletta and the Saint Kitts and Nevis national team. Besides Malta, Archibald has played club football in Saint Kitts and Nevis, Trinidad and Tobago, and Honduras.

== Club career ==
In the 2015 MLS Caribbean Combine, Archibald was one of two goalkeepers in the 19-player list and one of two players from Saint Kitts and Nevis.

He made the winning save for W Connection F.C. to prevent domestic rivals Central F.C. in a dramatic penalty-shoot-out. As a result, W Connection made the final of the 2015 Trinidad and Tobago Classic.

In 2018, he signed for Real de Minas.

In 2021, he signed for Santa Lucia. In 2022, he signed for Birkirkara.

== International career ==
Archibald was the Kittitian goalkeeper for the 2018 FIFA World Cup qualification stages against Turks and Caicos.

He also played in two friendlies, including a victory against Andorra.

== Career statistics ==
=== International ===
As of match played 17 November 2026

Appearances and goals by national team and year
National team	Year	Apps	Goals
Saint Kitts and Nevis	2008	2	0
Saint Kitts and Nevis	2009	2	0
Saint Kitts and Nevis	2010	1	0
Saint Kitts and Nevis	2012	3	0
Saint Kitts and Nevis	2014	6	0
Saint Kitts and Nevis	2015	6	0
Saint Kitts and Nevis	2016	7	0
Saint Kitts and Nevis	2017	1	0
Saint Kitts and Nevis	2018	5	0
Saint Kitts and Nevis	2019	7	0
Saint Kitts and Nevis	2021	5	0
Saint Kitts and Nevis	2022	2	0
Saint Kitts and Nevis	2023	14	0
Saint Kitts and Nevis	2024	10	0
Saint Kitts and Nevis	2025	6	0
Saint Kitts and Nevis	2026	8	0
Total		85	0
