= Jameel Ible =

Kittitian footballer

Personal information
- Date of birth: 26 November 1993 (age 32)
- Place of birth: Leeds, England
- Position: Centre-back

Team information
- Current team: Guiseley

Youth career
- Stockport County

Senior career*
Years	Team	Apps	(Gls)
2011–2012	Stockport County	0	(0)
2012–2013	Salford City		
2013	York City	0	(0)
2013–2014	Guiseley	8	(0)
2014–2016	Frickley Athletic	1	(0)
2016–2017	Scarborough Athletic	1	(0)
2017–2019	Frickley Athletic	70	(0)
2019–2020	Pontefract Collieries	30	(2)
2020–2022	Whitby Town	11	(0)
2022–2025	Guiseley	102	(12)
2025-	Bradford (Park Avenue) A.F.C.	7	(0)

International career^{‡}
2015–	Saint Kitts and Nevis	9	(0)
- * Club domestic league appearances and goals as of 21:33, 26 March 2025 (UTC) ‡ National team caps and goals as of 22:38, 10 June 2024 (UTC)

Jameel Ible (born 26 November 1993) is a footballer who plays as a centre-back for Bradford (Park Avenue) A.F.C. Born in England, he plays for the Saint Kitts and Nevis national team.

== Club career ==
A youth product of Stockport County, Ible began his senior career with the club in 2011. The following season, he moved to Salford City, and followed that up with a stint with York City. In 2013, he had his first stint with Guiseley, before moving to Frickley Athletic for a couple of years. He moved to Scarborough Athletic in 2016, before returning to Frickley for 2 more seasons. In 2019, he transferred to Pontefract Collieries for a couple of seasons, followed by a couple of seasons at Whitby Town. He rejoined Guiseley in the summer of 2022. On 2 April 2023, he extended his stay with Guiseley until 2024.

== International career ==
Born in England, Ible is of Kittian descent. He was first called up to the Saint Kitts and Nevis national team for a set of friendlies in May 2015. He was called up again for a set of CONCACAF Nations League matches in March 2023.
