= 2000–01 Kidderminster Harriers F.C. season =

Kidderminster Harriers
2000–01 season
- Chairman: Lionel Newton
- Manager: Jan Mølby
- Stadium: Aggborough Stadium
- Third Division: 16th
- FA Cup: Second round
- League Cup: First round
- Football League Trophy: Second round
- Top goalscorer: League: John Durnin (9); All: John Durnin (9) Stewart Hadley (9)

During the 2000–01 English football season, Kidderminster Harriers F.C. competed in the Football League Third Division.

== Season summary ==
In their first ever season in the Football League, Kidderminster Harriers finished 16th, eight points clear of relegation.

== Results ==
=== Football League Third Division ===
Third Division match results
Date	Opponent	Venue	Result F–A	Scorers	Attendance
12 August 2000	Torquay United	H	2–0	Hadley 16', Horne 62'	5,122
19 August 2000	Scunthorpe United	A	0–2		3,761
26 August 2000	Halifax Town	H	2–1	Hadley 28', 40'	2,956
28 August 2000	Brighton & Hove Albion	A	2–0	Foster 52', Bennett 67'	6,274
2 September 2000	Carlisle United	H	0–1		4,052
9 September 2000	Barnet	A	0–0		2,103
12 September 2000	Southend United	A	1–1	Shail 28'	2,403
16 September 2000	Leyton Orient	H	2–1	Hinton 77', Bennett 82'	3,365
23 September 2000	Cardiff City	A	0–0		8,003
29 September 2000	Blackpool	H	1–4	Ducros 77'	3,891
6 October 2000	Rochdale	H	0–0		3,094
14 October 2000	Lincoln City	A	3–3	Durnin 64', Ducros 67', Bennett 75'	2,922
17 October 2000	Darlington	A	2–1	Durnin 34', 46'	3,713
21 October 2000	Exeter City	H	0–0		3,269
24 October 2000	Chesterfield	H	0–2		3,844
4 November 2000	Cheltenham Town	H	1–1	Smith 14'	4,162
11 November 2000	Hartlepool United	A	1–3	Durnin 36'	2,726
25 November 2000	York City	H	3–1	Smith 15', 30', Foster 18'	2,602
2 December 2000	Macclesfield Town	H	2–1	Smith 30', 44'	2,638
23 December 2000	Hull City	A	0–0		5,470
26 December 2000	Mansfield Town	H	1–0	Durnin 3'	3,842
1 January 2001	Torquay United	A	1–1	Durnin 61'	2,467
6 January 2001	Halifax Town	A	2–3	Durnin 53', MacKenzie 65'	1,824
13 January 2001	Brighton & Hove Albion	H	0–2		4,056
23 January 2001	Mansfield Town	A	1–2	Broughton 17'	1,712
27 January 2001	Hull City	H	2–2	Durnin 34', Broughton 45'	3,029
30 January 2001	Plymouth Argyle	A	0–4		5,332
3 February 2001	Carlisle United	A	0–2		3,429
10 February 2001	Barnet	H	2–1	MacKenzie 55', Broughton 74'	2,585
17 February 2001	Leyton Orient	A	0–0		4,132
20 February 2001	Southend United	H	2–1	Bogie 65', Hadley 89	2,781
25 February 2001	Cardiff City	H	2–4	Broughton 14', 90'	4,317
3 March 2001	Blackpool	A	1–5	Coid 20' o.g.	4,624
6 March 2001	Lincoln City	H	1–3	Hadley 73'	2,471
10 March 2001	Rochdale	A	0–0		2,552
13 March 2001	Scunthorpe United	H	0–0		2,438
17 March 2001	Darlington	H	0–0		2,568
20 March 2001	Shrewsbury Town	A	0–1		2,761
24 March 2001	Exeter City	A	1–2	Bennett 87'	3,302
31 March 2001	Shrewsbury Town	H	3–1	Durnin 40', Hinton 53', Broughton 82'	4,548
7 April 2001	Macclesfield Town	A	0–1		1,585
14 April 2001	Chesterfield	A	0–1		4,495
16 April 2001	Plymouth Argyle	H	3–0	Hadley 5', MacKenzie 21' Skovbjerg 43'	3,321
21 April 2001	Cheltenham Town	A	3–1	Webb 20', Bird 45', Broughton 65'	4,415
28 April 2001	Hartlepool United	H	0–1		3,748
5 May 2001	York City	A	0–1		3,185

=== FA Cup ===
FA Cup match results
Round	Date	Opponent	Venue	Result F–A	Scorers	Attendance
First round	18 November 2000	Burton Albion	H	0–0		3,384
First round replay	28 November 2000	Burton Albion	A	4–2	Bogie 22', Hadley 27', 34', Bird 90'	3,760
Second round	9 December 2000	Carlisle United	H	0–2		2,533

=== League Cup ===
Football League Cup match results
Round	Date	Opponent	Venue	Result F–A	Scorers	Attendance
First round, first leg	22 August 2000	Walsall	A	0–0		5,552
First round, second leg	5 September 2000	Walsall	H	0–1		5,351

=== Football League Trophy ===
Football League Trophy match results
Round	Date	Opponent	Venue	Result F–A	Scorers	Attendance
First round	12 December 2000	Carlisle United	H	2–1 (a.e.t.)	Smith 44', Bird 100'	777
Second round	10 January 2001	Bury	A	0–2		1,015

== First-team squad ==
Squad at end of season

Note: Flags indicate national team as defined under FIFA eligibility rules; some limited exceptions apply. Players may hold more than one non-FIFA nationality.

No.	Pos.	Nation	Player
1	GK	ENG	Tim Clarke
2	DF	ENG	Ian Clarkson
3	DF	ENG	Scott Stamps
4	MF	ENG	Paul Webb
5	DF	ENG	Craig Hinton
6	DF	ENG	Adie Smith
7	MF	ENG	Dean Bennett
9	FW	WAL	Tony Bird
10	FW	ENG	Ian Foster
11	MF	DEN	Thomas Skovbjerg
12	DF	CMR	Parfait Medou-Otye
13	GK	IRL	Brendan Murphy

No.	Pos.	Nation	Player
14	GK	ENG	Andy Ducros
15	DF	SWE	Mark Shail
16	DF	ENG	Steve Pope
17	MF	ENG	Ben Davies
18	MF	ENG	Gary Barnett
20	MF	ENG	John Durnin
21	FW	ENG	Stewart Hadley
22	MF	ENG	Neil MacKenzie
23	MF	IRL	Daire Doyle
24	DF	ENG	Andrew Corbett
25	FW	ENG	Drewe Broughton
26	GK	ENG	Stuart Brock

=== Left club during season ===
Note: Flags indicate national team as defined under FIFA eligibility rules; some limited exceptions apply. Players may hold more than one non-FIFA nationality.

No.	Pos.	Nation	Player
8	MF	WAL	Barry Horne (to Walsall)
19	MF	ENG	Ian Bogie (released)

No.	Pos.	Nation	Player
22	DF	MLT	Dylan Kerr (sacked)
25	DF	ENG	Andy Brownrigg (to Greenock Morton)
