= Chris Smith (footballer, born 1981) =

English association football player

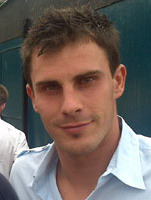
- Smith in 2009

Personal information
- Full name: Christopher Alan Smith
- Date of birth: 30 June 1981 (age 45)
- Place of birth: Derby, England
- Height: 5 ft 10 in (1.78 m)
- Position: Centre-back

Youth career
- –1996: Leeds United
- 1996–1999: Reading

Senior career*
Years	Team	Apps	(Gls)
1999–2001	Reading	0	(0)
2001–2004	York City	79	(0)
2004–2005	Stafford Rangers	23	(1)
2005–2008	Worcester City	101	(11)
2008–2010	Tamworth	70	(6)
2010–2011	Mansfield Town	15	(1)
2010–2011	→ York City (loan)	4	(0)
2011–2014	York City	105	(7)
2014	FC Halifax Town	10	(2)
2014–2015	Alfreton Town	8	(0)
2015	→ Tamworth (loan)	5	(0)
2015–2016	South Normanton Athletic		
2016–2017	Heanor Town		
2017–2018	Pinxton		
Total		420	(28)
- * Club domestic league appearances and goals

Christopher Alan Smith (born 30 June 1981) is an English former professional footballer who played as a centre-back in the Football League for York City.

Smith started his career with Leeds United's youth system, but aged 15 joined Reading in their youth system. In 1999, he signed a professional contract, before joining Third Division club York City in 2001. In the 2001–02 season, Smith did not establish himself as a first-team regular, but in 2002–03 became a fans' favourite. However, 2003–04 saw York relegated to the Conference National, and after being released by the club he spent a season with Stafford Rangers in the Conference North. In 2005, Smith joined their divisional rivals Worcester City, and in 2006–07 was named the club's Player of the Year. After a third season at Worcester, in which he was captain, the club was re-allocated to play in the Conference South.

Smith signed for Tamworth in 2008, winning the Conference North title in 2008–09, and thus promotion to the Conference Premier. After serving 2009–10 as captain, he signed for Tamworth's divisional rivals Mansfield Town in 2010. Later that year, he rejoined Conference Premier club York, initially on loan, and was immediately appointed captain. Smith captained York to victory in the 2012 FA Trophy Final and 2012 Conference Premier play-off final, both staged at Wembley Stadium, the latter seeing the club promoted to League Two. Having helped York avoid relegation in 2012–13, he fell out of favour the following season, joining Conference Premier club FC Halifax Town in 2014. Smith spent 2014–15 with Alfreton Town, including a loan spell back at Tamworth.

== Career ==
=== Early career ===
Born in Derby, Derbyshire, Smith began his career in Leeds United's youth system as a schoolboy having been spotted playing for a local junior team in Derby. After being released by Leeds he joined Reading's youth system aged 15, spending three years as a trainee before signing a professional contract on 22 June 1999.

=== York City ===
Smith had a two-match trial with Third Division club York City at the end of the 2000–01 season, impressing manager Terry Dolan. With him due to be released by Reading, Smith signed for York on 26 May 2001 on a two-year contract. He made his first-team debut as a 75th-minute substitute for Matt Hocking in a 3–2 home defeat against Exeter City on 6 October 2001. Smith made his first start for York in the following match, a 3–0 defeat away to Hartlepool United on 13 October 2001, Dolan describing his performance "as the one bright spot" from the match. However, following York's 4–1 away defeat by Kidderminster Harriers on 23 October 2001, Dolan placed the blame on the team's inexperienced defence. He did not feature in the team again until being recalled for an FA Cup first round 0–0 draw away to Colchester United on 17 November 2001. According to the Evening Press, Smith gave a "near-faultless display" when York beat his former club Reading 2–0 at home in the FA Cup second round on 8 December 2001. He was forced to miss the Christmas period with a virus, which resulted in him losing his place in the team, with Mike Basham, Gary Hobson and Hocking forming solid partnership. After being sent off for the first time in his career in a 3–0 defeat away to Rushden & Diamonds on 19 January 2002, he received a one-match suspension. Smith was substituted at half-time in York's 1–1 away draw with Halifax Town on 12 February 2002 due to a tight hamstring, returning over two months later in a 3–0 home victory over Bristol Rovers on 16 April. Having failed to establish himself as a first-team regular, Smith finished 2001–02 with 19 appearances for York.

He started 2002–03 well, taking his place in the team due to injuries to other players. He made his first appearance in the opening match, a 1–1 draw away to Macclesfield Town on 10 August 2002, with chairman John Batchelor claiming Smith had a "wonderful game and if we can get that sort of attitude from everyone in the team we won't have any problems". Smith was dropped to the bench for a 1–1 home draw with Wrexham on 29 October 2002 due to a change in formation, having started every match in 2002–03 prior to this match, although he did play as a 48th-minute substitute. He suffered a hamstring injury in early-November 2002, making his return in a 1–0 victory away to Rochdale on 23 November. Smith received his first red card of 2002–03 for a second bookable offence in a 1–1 home draw with Hull City on 28 December 2002, resulting in a one-match suspension. This meant he missed York's match against Torquay on 11 January 2003, and after a short spell on the sidelines returned in a 2–1 home win over Macclesfield on 2 February. Smith finished 2002–03 with 39 appearances for York, and was described by the Evening Press as the "surprise star of the season". Despite being in outstanding form and becoming a fans' favourite, he was not offered a new contract with York at the end of 2002–03 by Dolan, although he hoped to still to have a future at the club. This decision was reversed by newly appointed player-manager Chris Brass, and Smith signed a new one-year contract in July 2003.

Smith underwent a hernia operation in the close-season, but due to swelling and bruising around the bone his return was delayed and was an unused substitute for York's first match of 2003–04. He made his first appearance of the season as a second-half substitute for the injured Brass in a 2–0 defeat away to Bury on 30 September 2003, although Smith commented that: "It was my first appearance but unfortunately it was not one to remember". Due to injuries to other players, his first start of 2003–04 came in a 2–1 defeat away to Halifax in the Football League Trophy first round Northern section on 14 October 2003. This was followed by his first league start four days later in a 1–1 home draw with Boston, and York went on a seven-match unbeaten run in the league with Smith in defence alongside Brass and Richard Hope. He received his fifth yellow card of the season in a 2–1 away win over Rochdale on 28 December 2003, meaning he was suspended for York's match against Northampton Town on 17 January 2004. Smith was dropped for York's match against Scunthorpe on 9 March 2004 after failing to be vocal and organisational in defence in a 4–1 defeat away to Kidderminster three days earlier, which was expected of him due to Brass' absence. His return came in a 0–0 draw against Torquay on 13 March 2004, with Brass praising his performance. After York's relegation to the Conference National was confirmed in April 2004, it was announced that Smith would be released in the summer, despite having been verbally offered a new contract over a month before. He finished 2003–04 with 30 appearances.

=== Stafford Rangers ===
Smith dropped into non-League football after signing for Conference North club Stafford Rangers in the summer of 2004. He suffered with a knee injury in September 2004 and had an operation in October. His debut came in a 3–2 home victory over Stalybridge Celtic on 14 December 2004, scoring his first goal with the winner in a 1–0 victory away to Moor Green on 19 April 2005. He finished 2004–05 with 23 appearances and one goal for Stafford.

=== Worcester City ===
Smith joined Stafford's Conference North rivals Worcester City on 25 May 2005, manager Andy Preece calling him: "the best centre-half in the league by far". His debut came in the opening match of 2005–06, a 2–1 defeat away to Kettering Town on 13 August 2005, in which he performed impressively. He scored his first Worcester goal in a 2–1 home victory over Gainsborough Trinity on 20 August 2005, looping the ball over goalkeeper Jamie Holmshaw. Following this, Smith was described by the Worcester News as the team's "stand-out performer in the first eight days of the campaign". He missed Worcester's matches against Droylsden and Harrogate Town with an ankle injury sustained in a 2–2 away draw with Workington on 26 August 2005, making his return in a 1–0 home defeat by Hucknall Town on 10 September 2005. He played in a 1–0 home defeat by League One team Huddersfield Town in the FA Cup second round on 4 December 2005. Smith picked up an injury to his left knee during a 1–1 draw away to Stafford on 26 December 2005, with the bone bruising along with a tear to the posterior cruciate. He returned as a 79th-minute substitute in a 1–0 victory away to Northwich Victoria on 11 February 2006. Smith was made captain for the final match of the season, a 3–0 victory away to Worksop Town on 29 April 2006, and according to the Worcester News he "anchored his side expertly from the back". He made 40 appearances and scored four goals for Worcester in 2005–06.

Smith committed his future to the club over the summer of 2006 and captained the team during the 2006–07 pre-season. His first appearance of the season came in the opening match, a 1–0 victory away to Barrow on 12 August 2006, before scoring from inside the six-yard box in a 2–0 victory away to Worksop on 22 August. During August 2006, Smith started a spell of playing as a central midfielder after Des Lyttle moved into defence. After receiving his fifth yellow card of the season in a 3–2 home defeat by Harrogate on 6 October 2006, he was suspended for Worcester's match against Hucknall on 21 October 2006. He signed a new one-and-a-half-year contract with Worcester in December 2006, contracting him to the club until the summer of 2008. Smith received a two-match suspension after picking up his 10th booking of the season in a 3–1 home win over Hinckley United on 20 January 2007. This meant he missed matches against Welling United and Scarborough, before scoring on his return in a 3–3 home draw with Vauxhall Motors on 12 February 2007. He missed a match against Alfreton Town on 9 April 2007 to rest an ankle, despite playing through some previous matches with this complaint. Smith returned in the following match, a 2–1 home win over Worksop on 14 April 2007, as a 69th-minute substitute, despite not being fully fit. He completed 2006–07 with 47 appearances and five goals, and was named Worcester's Player of the Year. Throughout the season, he often deputised as captain when Lyttle was absent.

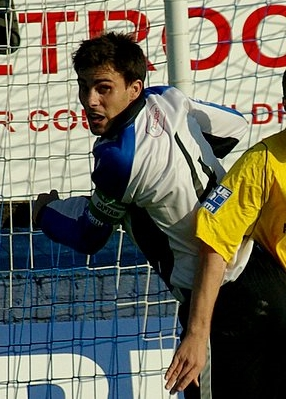
Smith playing for Worcester City in 2007

Smith took over as Worcester captain full-time during the 2007–08 pre-season before suffering an ankle injury in July 2007. Despite being doubtful to recover from this injury in time to play in the first match of the season, he started as Worcester were beaten 2–0 away by Hyde United on 11 August 2007. He suffered a hamstring injury and a recurrence of the ankle injury during this match, meaning he missed Worcester's match against Hinckley on 13 August 2007. He was due to be rested for the following match, a 2–1 defeat away to Burscough on 18 August 2007, but was brought on as a half-time substitute for the injured Adam Burley. His first goal of the season came after heading low into the goal for Worcester's second in a 3–1 home victory over Leigh RMI on 15 September 2007. After receiving his fifth yellow card of the season in a 2–1 home win over Stalybridge on 10 November 2007, he was suspended for Worcester's match away to Guiseley in the FA Trophy third qualifying round. Smith was sent off for the first time as a Worcester player after being the last man when pulling back Jason Walker when he was through on goal during a 1–1 home draw with Barrow on 1 December 2007. This resulted in him being suspended for Worcester's match against Boston on 15 December 2007. He returned in the next match, a 1–0 victory away to Harrogate on 22 December 2007.

Worcester's Conference North rivals AFC Telford United had a bid of £1,500 and a small additional payment for Smith rejected in January 2008, which Worcester manager Richard Dryden labelled as "derisory". Telford made a second bid, and if this had been successful, Smith would have become the club's record signing, as the eventual payment would have exceeded the £5,000 paid for Lee Moore in 2006. Worcester rejected Telford's second bid of £5,000, which would have potentially risen to a figure believed to be around £7,000 based on appearances, on 31 January 2008. He received his 10th yellow card of the season during a 1–0 defeat away to Stalybridge on 22 March 2008, resulting in a two-match suspension. His return came in a 6–0 defeat away to Blyth Spartans on 12 April 2008, before playing in the second leg of the Worcestershire Senior Cup final against Redditch, which Worcester lost 2–0 on the day and 2–1 on aggregate. The 2007–08 season, which Smith said was the worst of his career to date due to the injuries suffered throughout, saw him make 34 appearances and score three goals.

=== Tamworth ===
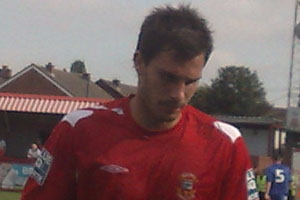
Smith playing for Tamworth in 2008

Having not wanted to play in the Conference South following Worcester's re-allocation into this division, Smith signed for Conference North club Tamworth on 28 May 2008. Gary Mills, the Tamworth manager, had previously tried to sign him for Notts County and Alfreton Town. He made his Tamworth debut in a 1–1 draw with Droylsden on 9 August 2008, before scoring his first goal in a 2–1 victory away to King's Lynn on 21 October after the ball fell to him from a corner kick in a crowded penalty area. An undiagnosed groin problem meant Smith missed Tamworth's match against Hinckley on 26 December 2008, although he returned for the following match, a 5–1 defeat away to Gateshead on 11 January 2009. He was forced into a late withdrawal from Tamworth's match against Burton Albion in the Birmingham Senior Cup on 13 January 2009 after his groin problem reappeared during the warm-up. His return to the team came on 24 January 2009 in a 2–1 victory away to Hyde, during which he conceded a penalty kick after fouling Chris Simm. Smith finished 2008–09 with Tamworth winning the Conference North title, thus earning promotion to the Conference Premier. He was named the club's Players' Player of the Season, having made 42 appearances and scored two goals in the process. Following the confirmation of Tamworth's title victory, he said: "We deserved to win the league though – from day one really – and full credit to the lads because they have all been superb". Smith signed a new one-year contract with the club in June 2009.

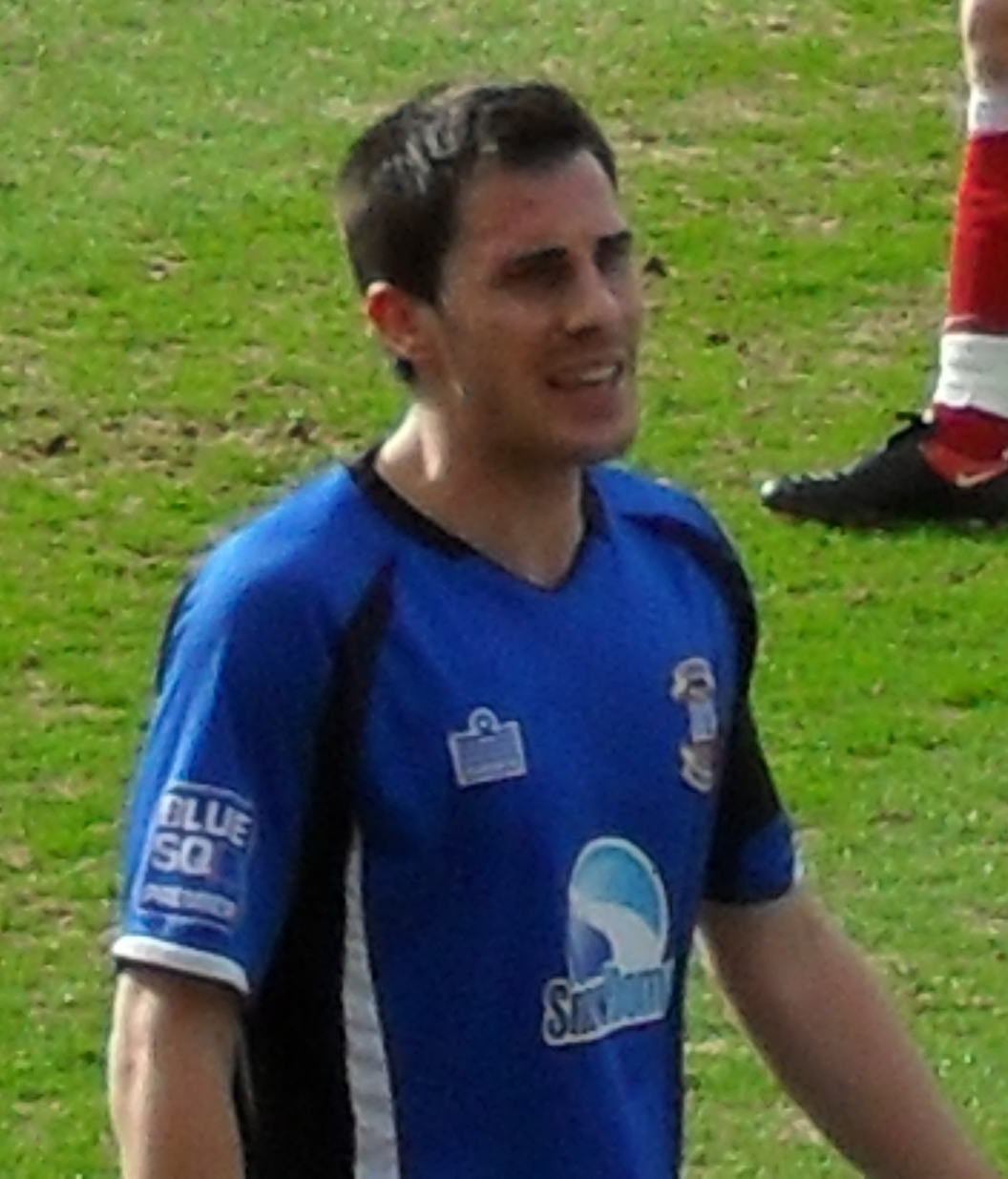
Smith playing for Tamworth in 2010

Following Martin Foster's departure, Smith was handed the Tamworth captaincy during the 2009–10 pre-season, which he described as a "massive honour". His first appearance of the season came in the opening match, a 1–1 draw away to Stevenage Borough on 8 August 2009. Smith's first goal of the season came after scoring a powerful header in a 2–1 home victory over Wrexham on 25 August 2009. In October 2009, he paid tribute to the defensive partnership he had struck up with Michael Briscoe, saying: "Football is about partnerships on the pitch, having trust in team-mates and good understandings and we seem to have one." Smith suffered a heel injury in October 2009, while also having a hernia problem that possibly needed an operation. After having a hernia operation, he was expected to be ruled out for a long-term period, but returned two weeks later in the following match, a 3–1 home win over Chester City on 14 November 2009. He was handed a one-match suspension after picking up his fifth yellow card of the season in a 0–0 home draw with Forest Green Rovers on 28 December 2009, meaning he missed Tamworth's match against Oxford United on 16 January 2010. His return came in a 0–0 draw away to Gainsborough in the FA Trophy second round on 19 January 2010. After receiving a yellow card in a 1–0 defeat away to Histon on 9 March 2010, he was given a two-match suspension, returning in a 2–0 away defeat by Cambridge United on 24 March. He scored from close range in the 82nd minute for Tamworth's equalising goal in his first match against York since leaving the club, which finished a 1–1 away draw on 27 March 2010. Smith made 38 appearances and scored four goals in 2009–10.

=== Mansfield Town ===
Having been disappointed by the new contract offered to him by Tamworth, Smith agreed on 25 May 2010 to join fellow Conference Premier team Mansfield Town on a one-year contract. He made his debut in a 3–1 home victory over Forest Green on 14 August 2010, the opening day of 2010–11, and his first goal came from a close range header as Mansfield beat Eastbourne Borough 4–0 at home on 25 September. He was Mansfield's stand-in captain for a 1–1 away draw with Gateshead on 2 October 2010. However, after Mansfield signed defenders Rhys Day and Simon Grand, Smith became surplus to requirements and was made available on loan.

=== Return to York City ===
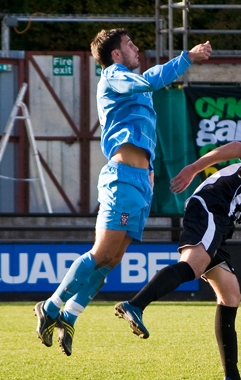
Smith playing for York City in 2010

Following Mills' appointment as manager at York City, Smith signed for his former club, by this time still playing in the Conference Premier, on 21 October 2010 on a three-month loan with a view to a permanent transfer. The move came after making 15 appearances and scoring one goal for Mansfield by that point in 2010–11. He was immediately installed as captain on his return and made his second debut as a York player in a 2–0 win away to Kidderminster in the FA Cup fourth qualifying round on 23 October 2010. After receiving his fifth yellow card of the season in a 0–0 draw away to League Two team Rotherham United in the FA Cup first round, he was handed a one-match suspension. Smith's return was marked by a goal for York with a header from Michael Rankine's left-footed cross in a 3–0 home win over Rotherham in the replay on 17 November 2010.

He signed for the club permanently on 5 January 2011 on a one-and-a-half-year contract that would expire in the summer of 2012. His first appearance after joining permanently came three days later in a 2–0 defeat away to Premier League team Bolton Wanderers in the FA Cup third round, which was the first time Smith had faced top-flight opposition in his career. After goalkeeper Michael Ingham's 15th-minute sending off away to Luton Town on 18 January 2011, Smith played in goal until half-time when being replaced by Greg Young, conceding four goals in a 5–0 defeat. He received a two-match suspension after picking up his 10th booking of the season in a 2–1 home win over Mansfield on 15 March 2011, meaning he missed York's matches against Cambridge and Histon. He returned in a 1–1 draw away to Kettering on 2 April 2011, before missing York's matches against Darlington and Cambridge in April due to worries involving the birth of his son. He finished 2010–11 with 30 appearances and one goal for York.

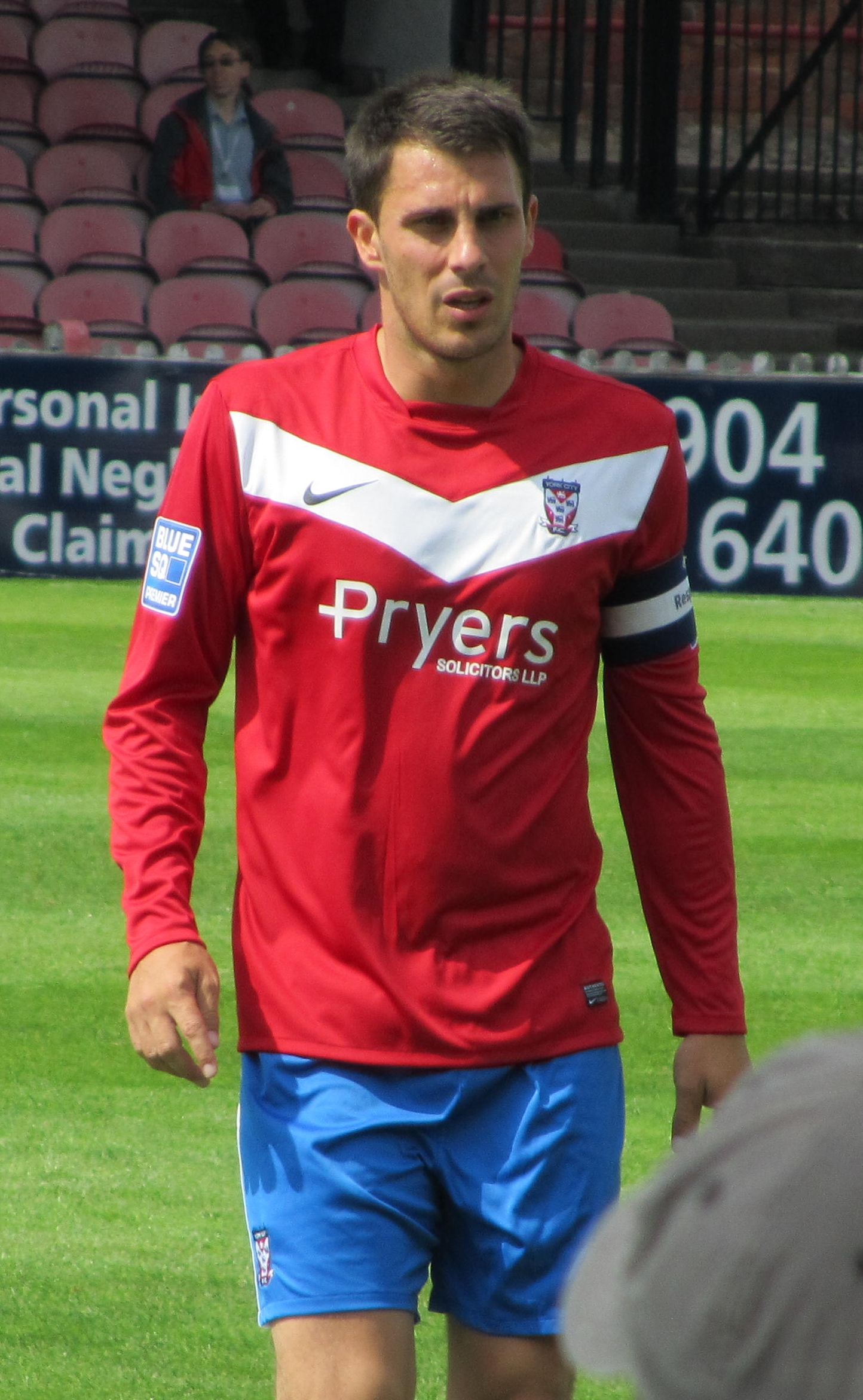
Smith playing for York City in 2011

Smith's 2011–12 season kicked off after starting York's opening match, a 2–1 away victory over Ebbsfleet United on 13 August 2011. During York's 2–1 defeat away to Tamworth on 10 September 2011, he conceded the opposition's two successfully converted penalty kicks. He was dropped from the starting line-up for the subsequent match against Bath City on 13 September 2011, with Jamal Fyfield taking his place in central defence. Smith remained out of the line-up until he started a 2–1 victory away to Stockport County on 1 October 2011, being favoured over Daniel Parslow as the replacement for the suspended David McGurk. He retained his place for the following match, a 6–2 home victory over Braintree Town on 8 October 2011, despite McGurk returning from suspension. Smith remained in the team until an FA Cup fourth qualifying round match away to Wrexham on 29 October 2011, when he and a number of other players were left out of the starting line-up, but was re-installed to the team for the 0–0 home draw match against Wrexham in the league on 5 November.

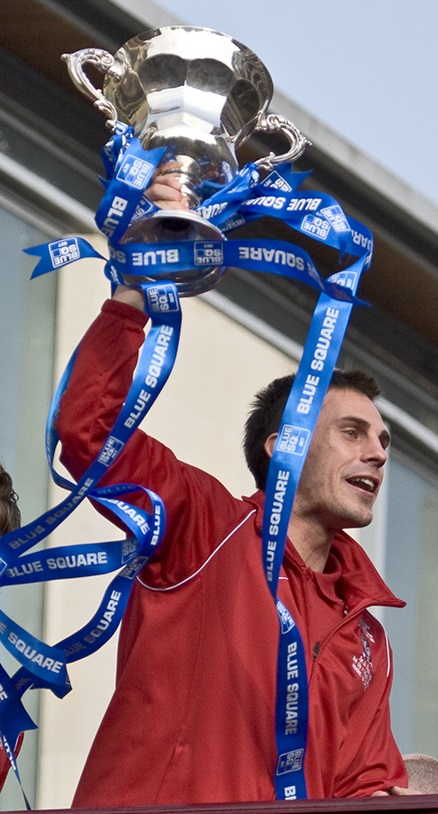
Smith with the victory parade that followed York City's victory in the 2012 Conference Premier play-off final

After making a mistake that led to York conceding a goal late on in a 1–1 draw away to Forest Green on 26 November 2011, he was replaced in the line-up by McGurk for the next match at home to Lincoln three days later. This was the start of a second extended spell out of the team for Smith that season, before returning to play as a defensive midfielder in a 3–5–2 formation for York's FA Trophy first-round replay away to Solihull Moors on 13 December 2011. He scored his first goal of the season in the 11th minute of this match, converting Scott Kerr's cross at the far post, with York going on to win 3–0. However, he returned to the bench for the subsequent league match against Kidderminster on 19 December 2011, with York reverting to their usual 4–3–3 formation. With York reverting to 3–5–2 for a 1–1 draw away to Mansfield on 26 December 2011, Smith returned as a defensive midfielder, but after picking up his fifth yellow card of the season was suspended for the reverse fixture at home to Mansfield on 1 January 2012. Smith captained York to victory in the 2012 FA Trophy Final at Wembley Stadium on 12 May 2012, with Newport County being beaten 2–0. This was the first time York had won a national knockout competition. Eight days later, he captained York to a 2–1 victory over Luton in the 2012 Conference Premier play-off final at Wembley Stadium, meaning the club regained Football League status after eight years with promotion to League Two.

Smith started York's match away to Doncaster Rovers in the League Cup first round in the opening match of 2012–13 on 11 August 2012, which the team lost 4–2 in a penalty shoot-out following a 1–1 draw after extra time. He played in York's first Football League fixture since their promotion, a 3–1 defeat at home to Wycombe Wanderers on 18 August 2012. His first goal of the season came three days later with a header in a 2–2 away draw with Morecambe. Smith scored York's goal in a 1–0 win away to Dagenham & Redbridge on 27 April 2013, as York avoided relegation on the final day of the season, with an eight-yard shot after collecting the ball from Michael Ingham's long free-kick. He finished the season with 50 appearances and four goals and rejected interest from a League One club to sign a new one-year contract with York in May 2013. Smith left York by mutual consent on 28 January 2014 having struggled to break into the team in the previous weeks.

=== Later career ===
He signed for FC Halifax Town of the Conference Premier on 23 February 2014 on a short-term contract. His debut came as a 70th-minute substitute for Adam Smith in a 2–0 home win over Tamworth on 1 March 2014. Smith's first start for Halifax did not come until 5 April 2014, in which he scored an 85th-minute winner in a 1–0 away win over Nuneaton Town with a header from a corner kick. He remained in the starting line-up for the remainder of 2013–14, and played in both play-off semi-final matches against Cambridge, in which Halifax were eliminated 2–1 on aggregate.

Smith signed for Conference Premier club Alfreton Town on 11 July 2014 on a one-year contract. He made his debut in a 3–1 home defeat to Woking on the opening day of 2014–15 on 9 August 2014. Having not played regularly for Alfreton, Smith returned to Tamworth on loan for the rest of the season on 6 March 2015. He made his second debut for Tamworth in their 6–0 away defeat Chorley in the Conference North on 28 March 2015, and finished the loan spell with five appearances. Smith was not retained by Alfreton for 2015–16, having made nine appearances as they were relegated in 21st place in the Conference Premier. In December 2015, Smith joined East Midlands Counties League club South Normanton Athletic. He signed for Heanor Town of the Midland League Premier Division in June 2016. He spent the 2017–18 season with Pinxton in the Central Midlands League South Division before retiring from playing. He won the Central Midlands League Challenge Cup with the club, scoring in the 4–3 win over Collingham in the final.

== Style of play ==
Smith primarily played as a centre-back. He was praised for his organisational skills and ability to communicate, Mills describing him in 2010 as "somebody on the pitch to organise with a big mouth". He was recognised for his goalscoring ability for a defender; in 2005, he was described by the Worcester News as "often a predator in the opposition's penalty box". He has also had spells playing at right-back and in defensive midfield; in the latter role "every attribute he has is geared to that job", said Worcester assistant manager Andy Morrison in 2006. He was described in 2003 by the Evening Press as being "cool on the ball, quick in the tackle and strong in the air". After signing for Worcester in 2005, Preece rated him as being "good on the ball, aggressive in the air, got a lot of pace and reads the game very well". He was recognised by the Worcester News as a "calm and assured presence in defence that breeds confidence throughout the team" in 2007. According to the Nottingham Post, he established himself as "a tough, uncompromising player with a winning mentality" at Tamworth, and these qualities led to Mansfield manager David Holdsworth signing him in 2010.

== Personal life ==
Smith and York teammate Neville Stamp were assaulted by a gang in an unprovoked attack while on a night out in York in August 2001, and after suffering concussion he was admitted to York District Hospital. As part of a scheme by York for forging links with local primary schools, he was involved with Lord Deramore's Primary School.

As of 2010, Smith lives in Derbyshire with girlfriend Chantelle. While playing as a semi-professional for Stafford, Worcester and Tamworth he combined playing with a plastering career, which he gave up after resuming his professional career with Mansfield.

== Career statistics ==
Appearances and goals by club, season and competition
Club	Season	League			FA Cup		League Cup		Other		Total	
Club	Season	Division	Apps	Goals	Apps	Goals	Apps	Goals	Apps	Goals	Apps	Goals
Reading	1999–2000	Second Division	0	0	0	0	0	0	0	0	0	0
Reading	2000–01	Second Division	0	0	0	0	0	0	0	0	0	0
Reading	Total		0	0	0	0	0	0	0	0	0	0
York City	2001–02	Third Division	15	0	3	0	0	0	1 (Note: Appearance(s) in Football League Trophy)	0	19	0
York City	2002–03	Third Division	36	0	1	0	1	0	1	0	39	0
York City	2003–04	Third Division	28	0	1	0	0	0	1	0	30	0
York City	Total		79	0	5	0	1	0	3	0	88	0
Stafford Rangers	2004–05	Conference North	23	1	0	0	—		0	0	23	1
Worcester City	2005–06	Conference North	31	3	7	1	—		2 (Note: Appearance(s) in FA Trophy)	0	40	4
Worcester City	2006–07	Conference North	38	5	5	0	—		4	0	47	5
Worcester City	2007–08	Conference North	32	3	1	0	—		1 (Note: Appearance in Conference League Cup)	0	34	3
Worcester City	Total		101	11	13	1	—		7	0	121	12
Tamworth	2008–09	Conference North	37	2	3	0	—		2 (Note: One appearance in Conference League Cup, one in FA Trophy)	0	42	2
Tamworth	2009–10	Conference Premier	33	4	0	0	—		5	0	38	4
Tamworth	Total		70	6	3	0	—		7	0	80	6
Mansfield Town	2010–11	Conference Premier	15	1	—		—		—		15	1
York City	2010–11	Conference Premier	24	0	5	1	—		1	0	30	1
York City	2011–12	Conference Premier	31	3	0	0	—		10 (Note: Seven appearances and one goal in FA Trophy, three appearances in Conference Premier play-offs)	1	41	4
York City	2012–13	League Two	45	4	2	0	1	0	2	0	50	4
York City	2013–14	League Two	9	0	2	0	1	0	1	0	13	0
York City	Total		109	7	9	1	2	0	14	1	134	9
FC Halifax Town	2013–14	Conference Premier	10	2	—		—		2 (Note: Appearances in Conference Premier play-offs)	0	12	2
Alfreton Town	2014–15	Conference Premier	8	0	0	0	—		1	0	9	0
Tamworth (loan)	2014–15	Conference North	5	0	—		—		—		5	0
Career total			420	28	30	2	3	0	34	1	487	31

== Honours ==
Tamworth

- Conference North: 2008–09

York City

- FA Trophy: 2011–12
- Conference Premier play-offs: 2012

Pinxton

- Central Midlands Football League Challenge Cup: 2018–19

Individual

- Worcester City Player of the Year: 2006–07
