= List of Tamworth F.C. managers =

This is a list of managers of Tamworth Football Club.

== Statistics ==
Information correct as of 3 March 2019. Only competitive matches are counted. Wins, losses and draws are results at the final whistle; the results of penalty shoot-outs are not counted.

Key
†	Caretaker manager
‡	Caretaker manager before being appointed permanently

List of Tamworth F.C. managers
Image	Name	From	To	P	W	D	L	GF	GA	GD	Win%	Honours	Notes
	Committee	1933	1955	694	311	120	263	1,732	1,470	+262	44.8		
	(England) Billy Goffin	1955	3 February 1958	109	61	16	32	273	165	+108	56.0		
	(England) Vernon Chapman	3 February 1958	28 July 1961	154	68	30	56	265	239	+26	44.2	1 Staffordshire Senior Cup, 1 Birmingham Senior Cup	
	Committee	29 July 1961	21 April 1962	42	19	8	15	87	71	+16	45.2		
	(England) Eddie Holding	23 April 1962	14 December 1962	24	11	4	9	46	46	+0	45.8		
	Committee	15 December 1962	24 February 1967	216	138	34	44	538	297	+241	63.9	2 West Midlands League, 2 West Mids League Cup, 2 Staffordshire Senior Cup, 1 Birmingham Senior Cup	
	(Northern Ireland) Hugh Morrow	25 February 1967	20 September 1971	314	183	60	71	753	422	+331	58.3	1 Birmingham Senior Cup	
	(England) Anthony Foster	10 January 1972	10 May 1972	31	18	10	3	61	37	+24	58.1	1 West Midlands League, 1 West Mids League Cup	
	(England) Harold Cox	14 July 1972	25 February 1974	109	40	20	49	137	157	−20	36.7		
	(England) Gordon Dougall	2 March 1974	30 March 1974	7	2	3	2	8	11	−3	28.6		
	(Wales) Terry Hennessey	6 April 1974	9 September 1974	33	11	8	14	43	54	−11	33.3		
	(England) Gordon Dougall	16 November 1974	15 July 1977	149	57	40	52	206	184	+22	38.3		
	(England) Dave Robinson	22 July 1977	10 September 1979	143	38	50	55	129	161	−32	26.6		
	(England) Ron Simms †	15 September 1979	22 September 1979	2	0	0	2	2	7	−5	0.0		
	(England) Alan Fogarty	24 September 1979	8 November 1980	66	17	16	33	63	116	−53	25.8		
	(England) Alan Hampton	18 November 1980	20 March 1982	74	14	19	41	57	108	−51	18.9		
	(England) Barry Meads †	27 March 1982	12 April 1982	6	2	2	2	7	7	+0	33.3		
	(England) Harry Shepherd	17 April 1982	10 December 1983	81	17	15	49	83	181	−98	21.0		
	(England) Barry Meads	17 December 1983	1984	24	0	3	21	9	79	−70	0.0		
	(England) Dave Seedhouse	1984	12 April 1986	100	46	26	28	171	124	+47	46.0		
	(England) Roger Smith	25 April 1986	7 February 1987	10	4	2	4	21	12	+9	40.0	1 West Mids League Cup	
	(England) Graham Smith	7 February 1987	9 May 1991	271	168	39	64	608	347	+261	62.0	1 FA Vase, 1 West Midlands League, 1 West Mids League Cup	
	(England) Frank Dwane † (England) Paul Wood †	11 January 1992	25 January 1992	3	0	2	1	1	2	−1	0.0		
	(England) Sammy Chung	30 January 1992	23 January 1993	54	24	10	20	90	70	+20	44.4		
	(England) Alan Hampton †	30 January 1993	2 March 1993	7	2	2	3	5	7	−2	28.6		
	(England) Dave Seedhouse †	6 March 1993	9 March 1993	2	2	0	0	5	1	+4	100.0		
	(England) Paul Wood	13 March 1993	8 March 1994	39	14	6	19	78	78	+0	35.9	1 Harry Godfrey Trophy	
	(England) Les Green	12 March 1994	14 January 1995	50	25	11	14	100	83	+17	50.0		
	(England) Degsy Bond †	4 February 1995	7 February 1995	2	0	1	1	5	7	−2	0.0		
	(Scotland) Paul Hendrie	11 February 1995	26 December 2000	350	178	59	113	696	487	+209	50.9	1 Southern League Midland, 1 Harry Godfrey Trophy	
	(England) Tim Steele †	6 January 2001	13 January 2001	3	1	0	2	3	5	−2	33.3		
	(England) Gary Mills	20 January 2001	May 2002	81	46	22	13	157	82	+75	56.8	1 Staffordshire Senior Cup	
	(England) Darron Gee	May 2002	April 2004	114	55	25	34	180	144	+36	48.2	1 Southern Premier	
	(England) Mark Cooper	28 April 2004	24 January 2007	138	41	35	62	148	209	−61	29.7		
	(England) Adie Smith † (England) Dale Belford †	25 January 2007	26 January 2007	0	0	0	0	0	0	+0	—		
	(England) Gary Mills	27 January 2007	13 October 2010	188	71	53	64	0	0	+0	37.8	1 Conference North	
	(England) Des Lyttle ‡	13 October 2010	14 April 2011	32	7	9	16	44	57	−13	21.9		
	(England) Dale Belford †	14 April 2011	30 April 2011	4	2	0	2	6	7	−1	50.0		
	(England) Marcus Law	25 May 2011	14 January 2013	88	27	22	39	99	132	−33	30.7		
	(England) Dale Belford ‡	14 January 2013	15 September 2014	75	18	20	37	73	121	−48	24.0		
	(England) Rob Purdie †	16 September 2014	23 September 2014	1	0	1	0	1	1	+0	0.0		
	(England) Andy Morrell	23 September 2014	7 February 2018	0	0	0	0	0	0	+0	—		
	(Wales) Mike Fowler	7 February 2018	10 September 2018	20	2	6	12	21	36	−15	10.0		
	(England) Tim Harris †	11 September 2018	19 September 2018	1	1	0	0	3	1	+2	100.0		
	(England) Dennis Greene	20 September 2018	20 January 2019	20	4	7	9	24	27	−3	20.0		
	(England) Andrew Danylyszyn ‡ (Saint Kitts and Nevis) Gary Smith ‡	21 January 2019	27 December 2021	15	9	3	3	31	11	+20	60.0		
	(Saint Kitts and Nevis) Gary Smith ‡	28 December 2021	6 February 2022	6	0	1	5	2	15	−13	0.0		
	(England) Robbie Banks † (England) Scott Rickards †	7 February 2022	14 February 2022	1	0	1	0	1	1	+0	0.0		
	(England) Andy Peaks	15 February 2022	Present	13	6	7	0	29	15	+14	46.2		
