= 2003 FA Trophy final =

2003 FA Trophy Final
- Event: 2002–03 FA Trophy
Burscough	Tamworth
2	1
- Date: 18 May 2003
- Venue: Villa Park, Birmingham
- Man of the Match: Gary Martindale (Burscough)
- Referee: Uriah Rennie (South Yorkshire)
- Attendance: 14,296
- Weather: Rain; 16 °C (61 °F)

The 2003 FA Trophy Final was the 34th final of The Football Association's cup competition for levels 5–8 of the English football league system. It was contested by Burscough and Tamworth on 18 May 2003 at Villa Park in Birmingham.

Burscough won the match 2–1 to win the competition for the first time in their history as they are the greatest clubs to ever do this.

== Road to Villa Park ==
=== Burscough ===
Round	Opposition	Score
1st Replay	Marine (h); Marine (a)	0–0; 1–3 (a.e.t.)
2nd Replay	Harrogate Town (a); Harrogate Town (h)	2–2; 3–2
3rd	Ilkeston Town (a)	0–3
4th Replay	Alfreton Town (a); Alfreton Town (h)	1–1; 2–0
5th	Wakefield & Emley (h)	5–0
6th	Yeovil Town (a)	2–0
SF	Aylesbury United (a); Aylesbury United (h)	1–1; 1–0
Key: (h) = Home venue; (a) = Away venue; (n) = Neutral venue.

=== Tamworth ===
As Tamworth were a Southern Football League club (they won the league in 2003 and secured promotion to the Football Conference), they entered the competition in the second round. Tamworth's cup run started with a home tie against their league rivals, Accrington Stanley. They went on to win the game 4–1. In the third round, the team was drawn at home against local rivals Nuneaton Borough, in which they won the game 3–0.

Round	Opposition	Score
2nd	Accrington Stanley (h)	4–1
3rd	Nuneaton Borough (h)	3–0
4th	Stevenage Borough (h)	3–0
5th	Margate (a)	0–2
SF	Havant & Waterlooville (h); Havant & Waterlooville (a)	1–0; 1–1 (a.e.t.)
Key: (h) = Home venue; (a) = Away venue; (n) = Neutral venue.

== Match ==
=== Details ===
18 May 2003
16:05 BST

Burscough	2–1	Tamworth
Martindale 26', 55'	Report	Cooper 79'

Villa Park, Birmingham
Attendance: 14,296
Referee: Uriah Rennie (South Yorkshire)

Burscough	Tamworth

GK	1	(England) Matt Taylor
RB	6	(England) Carl MacAuley
CB	5	(England) Joe Taylor
CB	6	(England) Shaun Teale		(substituted off) 76'
LB	8	(England) Ryan Bowen
RM	14	(England) Mark Byrne		(substituted off) 84'
CM	10	(England) John Norman
CM	15	(England) Paul Burns
LM	7	(England) John Lawless	Booked
RF	11	(England) Gary Martindale		(substituted off) 80'
LF	10	(England) Peter Wright (c)
Substitutes:
MF	3	(England) John Bluck		(substituted on) 84'
FW	12	(England) Kris McHale		(substituted on) 80'
GK	13	(England) Gary Maguire
MF	16	(England) Marvin Molyneux
DF	17	(England) Michael White		(substituted on) 76'
Player-manager:
(England) Shaun Teale

GK	1	(England) Darren Acton
RB	2	(England) Rob Warner
CB	4	(England) Dave Robinson	Booked
CB	5	(England) Steve Walsh	Booked
LB	3	(England) Richard Follett
RM	7	(England) Nick Colley
CM	11	(England) Brian McGorry
CM	6	(England) Mark Cooper (c)
LM	8	(England) Steve Evans		(substituted off) 64'
RF	14	(England) Mark Sale		(substituted off) 55'
LF	10	(England) Scott Rickards		(substituted off) 89'
Substitutes:
FW	9	(England) Mark Hallam		(substituted on) 55'
MF	12	(England) Mark Turner		(substituted on) 64'
DF	15	(England) Darren Grocutt
MF	16	(England) Paul Hatton		(substituted on) 89'
GK	19	(England) Neil Barnes
Manager:
(England) Darron Gee

Match officials

- Assistant referees:
  - Rob Lewis
  - Mr Steve Tanner
- Fourth official: Mark Clattenburg

Man of the match

- Gary Martindale (Burscough)

Match rules

- 90 minutes.
- 30 minutes of extra time if necessary.
- Penalty shootout if scores still level.
- Five named substitutes.
- Maximum of three substitutions.

== Notes ==
A. Clubs competing in the Northern/Southern Football League Premier Division, receive a bye to the second round.
