= History of Tamworth F.C. =

This article covers the History of Tamworth Football Club.

== Formation ==
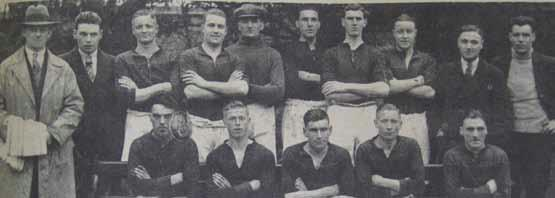
The Lambs squad in 1933.

The history of Tamworth Football Club began back in April 1933 when Michael Flowers, a London businessman who had moved to the Tamworth area wrote to the local paper "Tamworth Herald" concerned that his new home town did not have a senior football club. On Saturday 29 April 1933 a second letter was printed in the herald, by which Mr. Flowers had thanked fellow townsfolk for getting in touch with him and had secured a ground to play at with a capacity of 5,000.

“Sir, may I take this opportunity of thanking those who have responded to my letter regarding Tamworth and a Combination Football Club, which you kindly published in the ‘Herald’ last week? “No time has been wasted and a ground has been secured which will hold a 5,000 gate if required. A public meeting is being held on Wednesday next 10th inst at the Jolly Sailor Hotel, Tamworth, at 7pm sharp. Mr W Redfern has kindly consented to act as Chairman. “It is proposed to enter one team in the Birmingham Combination and a reserve team in the Tamworth and Trent Valley League. “Anyone who is interested in this movement to once again place Tamworth in senior football circles is asked to attend this meeting, “Yours etc, M Flowers, Magnet Restaurant, Market Street”

A public meeting was held on 10 May 1933 at the Jolly Sailor Hotel to discuss matters further. Mr. W. Redfern acted as the club's first Chairman with Mr. Flowers as the club secretary. Following a second public meeting, Mr. Flowers had high hopes of getting former Blackburn Rovers and England international Syd Puddefoot to play for the club.

== FA Vase 1989 ==
Tamworth managed by Graham Smith won the FA Vase in 1989, beating Sudbury Town in a replay.

The final was played at Wembley Stadium, but the game finished 1–1, meaning that the winner would have to be decided by a replay. The replay was played at a slightly less glamorous venue, London Road, the home of Peterborough United. Tamworth won the replay 3–0 to lift the FA Vase.

== Promotion to the Conference National and FA Trophy 2003 ==
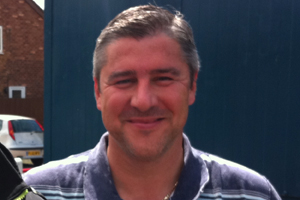
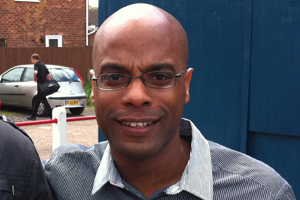
Mark Hallam and Warren Haughton, known as "The H Bombers" a popular strike force for The Lambs in the early 2000s.

Tamworth had a successful season in 2002/03 winning promotion to the Conference National after winning the Southern League, the club narrowly missed out the previous season with a 3–3 draw on the final day at Folkestone Invicta and with Kettering Town winning they pipped Tamworth to first place and won promotion to the Conference National.

Tamworth also reached the final of the FA Trophy at Villa Park, where they played Burscough managed by former Aston Villa defender Shaun Teale. Tamworth were denied the double losing 2–1 to Burscough.

== FA Cup 2005–06 ==
Despite struggling in the bottom half of the table since they reached the Conference National, The Lambs reached their furthest ever stage in the FA Cup. They beat Football League sides AFC Bournemouth and Hartlepool United To reach the Third Round. After drawing 0–0 with Championship side Stoke City away the Lambs earned a home replay which they drew 1–1, but were knocked out 4–3 on penalties

== FA Cup 2006–07 ==
Despite a fairly poor 2006/07 league campaign, Tamworth once again had a successful FA Cup run. After beating Burton Albion and Rushden & Diamonds Tamworth were drawn at home against Norwich City in the 3rd round, but lost 1–4.

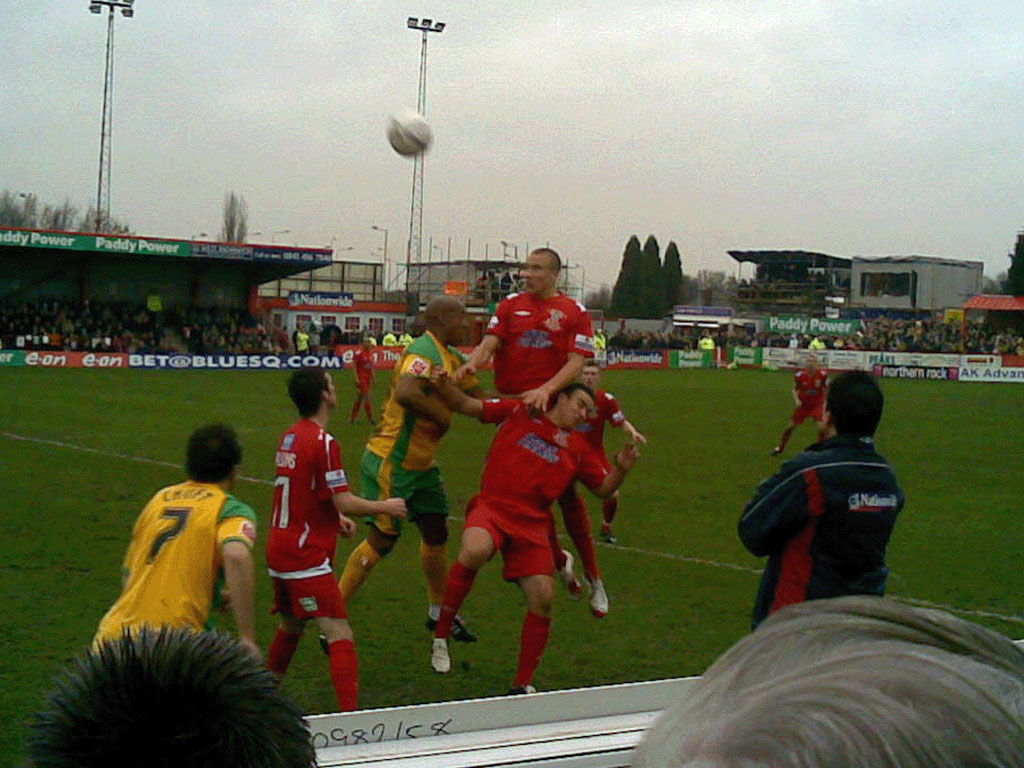
The Lambs battling against Norwich City

== Paul Merson ==
The club completed perhaps their highest profile signing of all time on 23 February 2006, with the capture of former Arsenal, Aston Villa, Walsall and England midfielder Paul Merson. However, the arrangement meant that until the end of the season, the majority of Merson's wages were to be paid by the club he used to manage, Walsall.

The arrangement only lasted two games, although Merson only played once in the 2–1 home loss to Halifax Town. Merson was dropped to the bench for the following game, a 5–0 defeat away to Grays Athletic.

Merson announced his retirement from professional football as a player on 9 March 2006, less than a month after joining Tamworth.

== Relegation ==
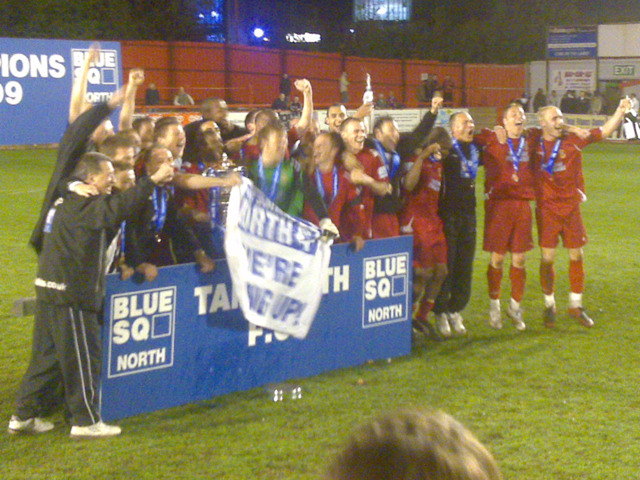
The Lambs celebrating a promotion back into the Conference National.

Although the club finished in 21st position in the Conference National in the 2005/06 season (the second relegation position), the club were spared the drop after Canvey Island resigned from the league. Altrincham also avoided the drop with Scarborough suffering a total points deduction for an as yet undeclared breach of the league's rules.

Just 18 days after the FA Cup 3rd round defeat to Norwich City, Tamworth manager Mark Cooper and assistant manager Richard Dryden were dismissed, due to the club been rooted to the foot of the table. They were replaced two days later by the former Tamworth managerial duo of first manager Gary Mills and assistant Darron Gee, who arrived two days later, they were both formally with Alfreton Town.

Tamworth found a new lease of life under Mills and Gee, and at times looked like they had enough to remain in the Conference, but were eventually relegated after finishing in 22nd position, had the club have finished in 21st position (the final relegation place) they again would have been spared the drop, due to Boston United been relegated two divisions due to finance issues. Altrincham, ironically were the team who finished 21st and were re-instated to the Conference National for the second time in as many seasons, Tamworth and Boston United went on to both compete in the Conference North for the 2007/08 season.

After finishing 15th in the 2007/08 season, Tamworth set their sights on a promotion back to the Conference National and by the end of April, they had achieved this by finishing 1st in the Conference North.
