= Skovbjerg =

Skovbjerg is a Danish surname. Notable people with the surname include:

- John Skovbjerg (born 1956), Danish marathon runner
- Thomas Skovbjerg (born 1974), Danish footballer

== See also ==
- Skovbjerg, a forest in the Mols Bjerge National Park
