= Steve Tanner (referee) =

English football referee

- Full name: Stephen J. Tanner
- Born: 21 October 1970 (age 56); Bristol, England

Domestic
| Years | League | Role |
| ? –2002 | Southern League | Referee |
| 2002–2003 | Conference South | Referee |
| 1998–2003 | Football League | Assistant referee |
| 2003–2007; 2009–2012 | Football League | Referee |
| 2007–2009 | Premier League | Referee |

International
| Years | League | Role |
| 2008–2009 | FIFA | Referee |

Stephen J. Tanner (born 21 October 1970 in Bristol) is an English former association football referee who operated in the Premier League and The Football League. Tanner was also a FIFA listed referee between 2008 and 2009.

== Career ==
He began refereeing in 1987, eventually officiating in the Southern League until 2002, during which he was promoted to the list of Football League assistant referees (in 1998).

He was a referee in the Football Conference South from 2002 to 2003.

As an assistant referee, Tanner officiated in the 2003 FA Trophy final. In the same year, he progressed to the National List of Football League referees, taking control of his first match on 9 August 2003, between Football League Third Division sides Kidderminster and Mansfield Town, the home side winning 2–1.

He took charge of the Championship play-off semi-final second leg between Watford and Crystal Palace at Vicarage Road on 9 May 2006, which ended 0–0.

Tanner was promoted to the PGMO Ltd Select Group of referees at the start of the 2007–08 season. He had already refereed three Premier League games in the previous season as 'trial' matches, the first of which was the encounter between Reading and Everton at the Madejski Stadium on 23 December 2006, with the away side winning 2–0. However, the second of those appointments, Watford against Wigan Athletic, was abandoned early in the second half due to heavy rain with the score at 1–1. The match was subsequently struck from Premier League records.

On 13 May 2007, Tanner was man-in-the-middle for the Championship play-off semi-final first leg between Wolves and West Bromwich Albion at Molineux, which finished in a 3–2 away win. On 1 January 2008 he was added to the FIFA list of referees, allowing him to referee in international and continental competitions.

Tanner had his place on the select group of referees relinquished, along with Keith Stroud, in November 2009, and has therefore also lost his place on the international list for 2010.

Following the 2011/12 football season, Tanner took up the role of Referee Development Officer at Gloucestershire FA, and subsequently retired from refereeing.

=== Career statistics ===
| Season | Games | Total (yellow card) | (yellow card) per game | Total (red card) | (red card) per game |
|---|---|---|---|---|---|
| 2002/2003 | 5 | 13 | 2.60 | 1 | 0.20 |
| 2003/2004 | 28 | 107 | 3.82 | 10 | 0.36 |
| 2004/2005 | 33 | 91 | 2.76 | 9 | 0.27 |
| 2005/2006 | 37 | 129 | 3.49 | 9 | 0.24 |
| 2006/2007 | 35 | 93 | 2.66 | 3 | 0.08 |
| 2007/2008 | 34 | 103 | 3.02 | 3 | 0.08 |
| 2008/2009 | 37 | 116 | 3.13 | 8 | 0.19 |
