= Adie Smith =

English footballer (born 1973)

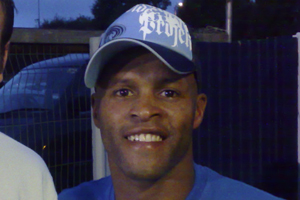
- Smith in 2008

Personal information
- Full name: Adrian Jonathan Smith
- Date of birth: 11 August 1973 (age 53)
- Place of birth: Birmingham, England
- Height: 5 ft 10 in (1.78 m)
- Position: Defender

Youth career
- 1994–1995: Birmingham City

Senior career*
Years	Team	Apps	(Gls)
1994–1995	Willenhall Town		
1995–1997	Bromsgrove Rovers	96	(6)
1997–2004	Kidderminster Harriers	211	(12)
2004–2008	Tamworth	167	(8)
2008–2009	Chasetown	10	(0)
2009–2013	Rushall Olympic		
- * Club domestic league appearances and goals

Adrian Jonathan Smith (born 11 August 1973) is an English former footballer who during his career played for as a youth player for Birmingham City, and went on to a professional career with Willenhall Town, Bromsgrove Rovers, Kidderminster Harriers, Tamworth, Chasetown and Rushall Olympic. He played as a defender.

== Career ==
=== Birmingham City ===
Smith started his career in 1994 with his local side Birmingham City with a two-year deal.

=== Willenhall Town ===
Smith failed, however, to make the first team with Birmingham City, and after being released he moved on to join Midland Football Alliance side Willenhall Town in 1995, whilst working on a part-time basis as a roofer.

Smith spent one season with Willenhall Town, in which he turned in some very impressive performances, which alerted interest from other clubs.

=== Bromsgrove Rovers ===
Smith began to rise up the leagues and he joined Football Conference side Bromsgrove Rovers on 1 August 1996, with Rovers manager Bobby Hope paying a fee of £1,500 for his services.

Smith spent one season with Bromsgrove Rovers, but the season ended in disappointment when the club was relegated.

=== Kidderminster Harriers ===
Smith's performances with Bromsgrove Rovers did not go unnoticed and captured the interest of local rivals Kidderminster Harriers, whom he joined on 1 August 1997 for £19,000. The move gave Smith another crack at Conference football.

Smith became a fans' favourite at Kidderminster and, after just two seasons in the Conference, Smith and Harriers won the Conference title in the 1999–2000 season, and they were promoted to the Third Division.

He stayed with Kidderminster for another three seasons in the Third Division, but on 6 February 2004, it was confirmed that a disappointed Kidderminster manager Jan Mølby had agreed to Smith's request for his contract to be terminated for personal reasons.

Smith had become a great servant to Kidderminster Harriers, playing 243 games and scored 13 goals. He explained that his sudden decision to quit Kidderminster had been based on his wanting to turn semi-professional as he believed he could no longer play at a professional level.

=== Tamworth ===
Three days later, Tamworth manager Darron Gee announced the signing of Smith on an 18-month contract. Smith completed the remainder of the season with Tamworth, with the club finishing in 17th position and avoiding relegation.

Smith's second season with Tamworth was without doubt the best for a league perspective, the club were yet again seen as potential relegation battlers, but defied the odds to finish 15th and make history with the Lambs gaining their highest league position in their history, although by the end of this season, Smith's contract had run out.

On 14 April 2005, Smith showed his loyalty to the club by signing a new contract. By this point, he had become the club's captain and led them to a place in the FA Cup Third Round. The club drew Stoke City and managed to take them to a replay at the Lamb, before going out on penalties.

Although Smith and Tamworth had a very successful Cup run, the club failed to emulate the same form in the league and were relegated after finishing 21st. The club were reinstated when Canvey Island withdrew from the league due to financial problems.

Smith and Tamworth started the 2006–07 season and finished it pretty much the same as they did the previous season. He and goalkeeping coach Dale Belford took charge of the first-team following the departure of manager Mark Cooper and assistant manager Richard Dryden in January 2007. The club repeated the success they had enjoyed in the previous season by reaching the third round of the FA Cup, but another disappointing league campaign saw Tamworth finish 22nd and be relegated from the Conference.

Despite their relegation, Smith signed a new one-year contract with the Staffordshire club on 4 May 2007. Smith explained that his decision was an easy one, due to his love for the club, fans and people at the club.

=== Chasetown ===
After four years with The Lambs, Smith finally moved on to Southern League Division One Midlands side Chasetown for the 2008/09 season.

=== Rushall Olympic ===
On 14 November 2009, Smith joined Rushall Olympic. Smith again became a very popular figure at the club, quickly establishing himself as first team captain. In the conclusion to the 2010–11 season with Rushall seeking promotion Smith was injured in an away game at Romulus in the closing weeks of the season. It seemed his season was over as his cheekbone was broken. However, he returned to lead the team out for the play-off final wearing a protective face mask sourced from Warwickshire County Cricket Club. Rushall won the play-off final and were promoted to Step 3 of English Non-League Football for the first time in their history. Smith started the 2011–12 campaign in good form but he suffered a serious achilles tendon injury in an away fixture at Hednesford Town and was ruled out for the season.

Stafford Town Adie was appointed Assistant Manager to Adam Cunningham during the 2013/14 campaign, he also played for them when they were short of players, Adie left his position as assistant at the start of the 2015-16 campaign.

== Honours ==
Kidderminster Harriers

- Football Conference: 1999–2000
