= Michael Briscoe =

English footballer (born 1978)

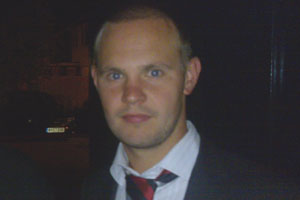
- Briscoe in 2009

Personal information
- Full name: Michael James Briscoe
- Date of birth: 4 July 1983 (age 43)
- Place of birth: Northampton, England
- Height: 6 ft 1 in (1.85 m)
- Position: Defender

Youth career
- 2002–2003: Harpole F.C.

Senior career*
Years	Team	Apps	(Gls)
2003–2004	Coventry City	0	(0)
2004–2006	Macclesfield Town	98	(9)
2005	→ Burton Albion (loan)	21	(2)
2006–2007	Hucknall Town	43	(3)
2007	→ Tamworth (loan)	38	(6)
2007–2008	Tamworth	28	(3)
2008–2009	Halesowen Town	33	(2)
2009–2010	Tamworth	41	(6)
2010–2012	Kidderminster Harriers	74	(4)
2012–2013	AFC Telford United	17	(1)
2013–2018	Stourbridge	157	(6)
- * Club domestic league appearances and goals as of 17:38, 6 April 2013 (UTC)

Michael James Briscoe (born 4 July 1983) is an English retired footballer who played as a defender.

== Career ==
=== Harpole ===
Born in Northampton, Northamptonshire, Briscoe started his career with his local Northamptonshire based club Harpole F.C.

=== Coventry City ===
He joined Coventry City after just one season with Harpole. Briscoe spent a season with The Sky Blues, and started the season off strongly managing to find the net once in his short spell, however he picked up an injury towards the end of the season.

=== Macclesfield Town ===
Briscoe then moved on to join League Two side Macclesfield Town on 3 June 2004. During his time with the club he made 98 appearances and found the nine times, a significant improvement from last season, but was released on 9 May 2006.

=== Burton Albion loan ===
Briscoe was sent out to Burton Albion on 8 March 2005. He made 21 appearances, and found the net on two occasions in the short time he was there.

=== Hucknall Town ===
Not even a month had passed following Briscoe's release from Macclesfield when he joined Nottinghamshire based club Hucknall Town of the Conference North in May 2006. He made 43 appearances and 4 goals

=== Tamworth ===
Briscoe joined Conference National side Tamworth initially on a month's loan on 20 January 2007, having previously worked with new manager Gary Mills during his time on the coaching staff at Coventry. Briscoe's loan move was later extended to the end of the season.

On 17 May 2007, Briscoe joined Tamworth on a permanent deal, after spending the most part of the following season on loan with The Lambs.

Briscoe also revealed he turned down moves to League Two clubs Wrexham and former club Macclesfield and Conference outfit Stafford Rangers and stated that the arrival of Gerry Taggart had excited him and looked forward to playing alongside the former Bolton Wanderers and Leicester City man at the heart of the Lambs defence.

=== Halesowen Town ===
Briscoe joined Halesowen Town at the end of his 2007/08 campaign with Tamworth in the Conference North.

=== Kidderminster Harriers ===
On 1 July 2010 he signed for Conference side Kidderminster Harriers, four years after having a pre-season trial with the club. At the end of the 2011/12 season his contract ran out and left the club.

=== AFC Telford ===
On 28 June 2012 he joined neighbours AFC Telford. Due to injuries he only played 17 league games. On 11 May 2013 it was announced he was released by Telford with 5 other players.
