= Rob Warner (footballer) =

English footballer

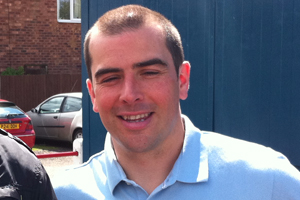

Personal information
- Full name: Robert Warner
- Date of birth: 20 April 1977 (age 49)
- Place of birth: Stratford, England
- Position: Defender

Senior career*
Years	Team	Apps	(Gls)
1995–1998	Hereford United	54	(0)
1998–2004	Tamworth	330	(8)
2004–2006	Worcester City	110	(1)
2006–2007	Halesowen Town	50	(0)
- * Club domestic league appearances and goals

Robert Warner (born 20 April 1977) is an English former footballer who played as a defender. During his career Warner listed Hereford United, Tamworth, Worcester City and Halesowen Town among his former clubs.

== Career ==
Born in Stratford, London, Warner started his profession career with Hereford United as a 17-year-old, going on to be voted young player of the year and being selected for the Welsh U18s before breaking a leg.

He then moved on to Tamworth where he accomplished such things as reaching the FA Cup second round and winning promotion to the Football Conference playing over 330 games. He also featured in the team that played against Burscough in the FA Trophy final at Villa Park.

2004 saw Warner leave The Lambs to join Worcester City. During his time with City, Warner played in the FA Cup second round against Huddersfield Town in which they lost 1–0.

Warner left Worcester City and joined Halesowen Town on 22 July 2006. After completing one season with Halesowen Town, Warner decided to retire from the game in May 2007, stating that due to his business commitments increasing considerably, he was unable to fully commit to playing part-time for a club.
