= Paul Webb (footballer) =

English footballer (born 1967)

Personal information
- Date of birth: 30 November 1967 (age 58)
- Place of birth: Wolverhampton, England
- Position: Midfielder

Senior career*
Years	Team	Apps	(Gls)
1986–1994	Bromsgrove Rovers		
1994–2001	Kidderminster Harriers	77+	(2+)
2001	→ Hereford (loan)	13	(0)
2002	Evesham United		
- * Club domestic league appearances and goals

Paul Webb (born 30 November 1967) is an English former footballer who played as a midfielder. Known as The Ledge

== Career ==
Webb started his career with English sixth tier side Bromsgrove Rovers, helping them earn their first-ever promotion to the English fifth tier. In 1994, he signed for Kidderminster Harriers in the English fifth tier, helping them earn their first-ever promotion to the English fourth tier. Before the second half of 2001–02, Webb signed for English seventh tier club Evesham United.
