= Parfait Medou-Otye =

French former footballer (born 1976)

Personal information
- Full name: Andre Parfait Medou Otye
- Date of birth: 29 November 1976 (age 49)
- Place of birth: Ekoundendi, Cameroon
- Height: 5 ft 10 in (1.78 m)
- Position: Central defender

Senior career*
Years	Team	Apps	(Gls)
1993–2000	Le Havre AC		
1999–2000	→ Le Mans Union Club 72 (loan)	8	(0)
2000	Greenock Morton	10	(0)
2000–2002	Kidderminster Harriers	19	(0)
2002	Stourport Swifts		
2002–2003	Bromsgrove Rovers	1	(0)
- * Club domestic league appearances and goals as of 22:41, 26 November 2009 (UTC)

Parfait Medou-Otye (born 29 November 1976, in Ekoudendi, Cameroon) is a French former footballer born in the Cameroon. Medou-Otye played a central defender and midfielder in France with Le Havre AC and Le Mans Union Club 72. After leaving France, he played in the United Kingdom for Greenock Morton, Kidderminster Harriers, Stourport Swifts and Bromsgrove Rovers, before heading to Réunion to finish his career.

== Career ==
He played as a defender in Scotland for Greenock Morton after starting his career with Le Havre AC in France, with a short spell on loan with Le Mans Union Club 72. After Morton suffered from financial hardships, Medou-Otye signed for Kidderminster Harriers before having to retire due to a heart condition.

He returned to France, but after a short time out of the game was told that he did not have a heart condition. Medou-Otye made a comeback in the lower levels of the English game with Stourport Swifts, before moving to Bromsgrove Rovers, Medou-Otye played only 25 minutes for them before sustaining an injury and leaving through mutual consent.

After leaving England, Medou-Otye moved to Réunion for a while to play.

== After football ==
He is now working as an agent and has his own clothing label.
