= Scott Rickards =

English footballer and coach

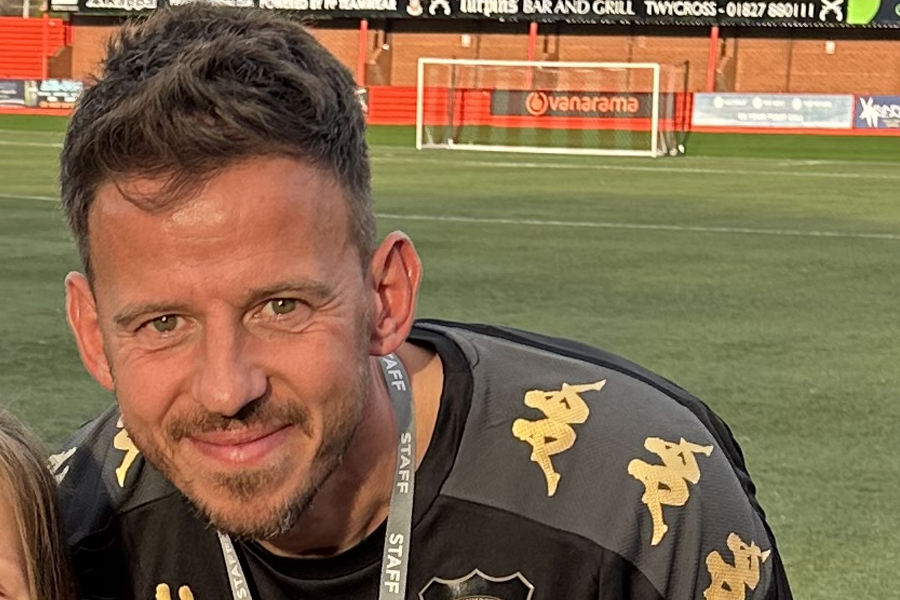
- Rickards in October 2023

Personal information
- Full name: Scott Rickards
- Date of birth: 3 November 1981 (age 44)
- Place of birth: Sutton Coldfield, England
- Height: 1.75 m (5 ft 9 in)
- Position: Forward

Team information
- Current team: Derby County (academy coach)

Youth career
- Derby County

Senior career*
Years	Team	Apps	(Gls)
2001–2003	Tamworth	20	(3)
2003–2004	Kidderminster Harriers	18	(1)
2004–2005	Redditch United	31	(12)
2005–2006	Tamworth	7	(0)
2006	Nuneaton Borough	5	(1)
2006–2006	Redditch United	21	(9)
2007	Alfreton Town	8	(1)
2007–2008	Brackley Town	0	(0)
2008–2009	Redditch United	0	(0)
2009	Solihull Moors	9	(1)
2009–2010	Halesowen Town	42	(6)
2010–2012	Barwell	30	(3)
2012	→ Bolehall Swifts (loan)	5	(1)
2012	Chasetown	4	(1)
2013–2014	Rainworth Miners Welfare		
2014	Walsall Wood	1	(0)
2014–2015	Barwell	3	(0)
2014–2015	→ AFC Mansfield (loan)	7	(2)
2015	Highgate United		
2015	Coleshill Town	1	(0)
2015–2016	Bolehall Swifts	5	(1)
2016	Highgate United	4	(0)
2016–2017	Walsall Wood	3	(0)
2017–2018	Highgate United	14	(1)
2018	Heather St John's	4	(0)
2018–2019	Highgate United	7	(0)
2019–2020	Atherstone Town	1	(0)
2020	Coton Green		

Managerial career
- 2013: Rainworth Miners Welfare (caretaker)
- 2013–2014: Rainworth Miners Welfare (player-manager)
- 2018: Tamworth (assistant)
- 2019: Highgate United (assistant)
- 2019–2020: Atherstone Town
- * Club domestic league appearances and goals

Scott Rickards (born 3 November 1981 in Sutton Coldfield, England) is a former professional footballer, who works as an academy coach for Derby County.

== Career ==
Rickards left Redditch United to join Alfreton Town on 9 August 2007.

Rickards then went on to play for Halesowen Town having signed in 2009.

== Coaching and later career ==
=== Rainworth Miners Welfare ===
In the summer 2013, Rickards joined Rainworth Miners Welfare and was later appointed caretaker manager. Rickards impressed the management committee in his short tenure as caretaker manager and on 23 September the club confirmed, that he had been hired permanently and also would continue to play for the club. In August 2014, Rickard resigned from his position for personal reasons.

=== Mansfield Town and Tamworth ===
In March 2015, Rickards was appointed Head Of Recruitment and academy coach at Mansfield Town and two months later, he also joined Highgate United as a player, where he also later functioned as a 1st team coach/assistant.

In the summer 2017, he was hired as an academy coach at his former club Tamworth and was in February 2018 promoted to 1st team assistant which he would combine with his existing full-time youth development role at Mansfield Town. He left his position in Tamworth in the summer 2018 and Mansfield in the summer 2019.

=== Derby County, return to Tamworth and Atherstone ===
In September 2019 it was confirmed, that Rickards had returned to his former childhood club Derby County in an under-13s coaching role and at the same time, he also returned to another of his former clubs, Tamworth, to work with the club's academy.

On 28 October 2019, Rickards was also appointed manager of Atherstone Town. In mid-February 2020, Rickards resigned after racist abuse from fans in three successive matches.

Following his departure from Atherstone Town, Rickards turned out for Midland League Division Two side Coton Green.
