= Thomas Skovbjerg =

Danish footballer (born 1974)

Personal information
- Date of birth: 25 October 1974 (age 50)
- Place of birth: Denmark
- Position(s): Winger

Senior career*
Years	Team	Apps	(Gls)
	Esbjerg fB	12	(0)
1993-199x	Ikast FS	12+	(1+)
1996-1999	Esbjerg fB		
1999-2001	Kidderminster Harriers F.C.	43	(5)
- *Club domestic league appearances and goals

Thomas Skovbjerg (born 25 October 1974, in Denmark) is a Danish retired footballer who is last known to have worked as a teacher in his home country.

== Career ==
Skovbjerg started his senior career with Esbjerg fB. In 1999, he signed for Kidderminster Harriers in the English Football League Third Division, where he made forty-three appearances and scored five goals before retiring in 2001.
