= Darron Gee =

English football manager

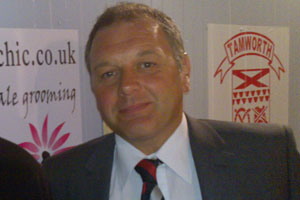
- Gee in 2009 while with Tamworth

Personal information
- Place of birth: England
- Position: Midfielder

Senior career*
Years	Team	Apps	(Gls)
- Hucknall Town

Managerial career
- 1995–1996: Dunkirk
- 2002–2004: Tamworth
- 2007: Alfreton Town
- * Club domestic league appearances and goals

Darron Gee is an English former footballer who played as a midfielder. He was most recently the assistant manager of York City.

Gee played in non-League football with Hucknall Town, before moving into management with Dunkirk, with whom he won promotion to the Central Midlands League Supreme Division in the 1995–96 season. He went on to have spells as Gary Mills' assistant manager at Grantham Town, King's Lynn and Tamworth. He took over as Tamworth manager in 2002, and in a two-year spell won the Southern League Premier Division title, reached an FA Trophy final and kept the club in the Football Conference. He worked with Mills again at Notts County and Alfreton Town, and after initially taking over as manager at Alfreton, followed Mills to Tamworth in 2007. Having won the Conference North title in 2009, the pair moved on to York City in 2010, winning the Conference Premier play-offs and FA Trophy in 2011–12. Both left the club in 2013.

== Playing career ==
Gee spent 12 years as a reserve-team midfielder and committee member for Hucknall Town in non-League football, although his playing career was hampered by recurrent injuries to his right knee. Having had seven operations on his knee, he was unable to pursue a playing career in professional football.

== Managerial and coaching career ==
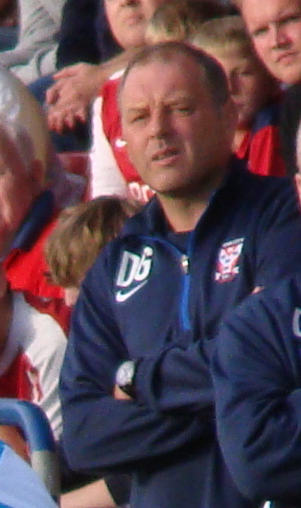
Gee during a York City match in 2011

Gee started his managerial career with Dunkirk, leading them to second place in the Central Midlands League Premier Division in the 1995–96 season, thus winning promotion to the Central Midlands League Supreme Division. He left the club after one season to become Gary Mills' assistant manager at Grantham Town in July 1996. Gee had become acquainted with Mills having lived with his Nottingham Forest teammate Colin Walsh. The pair were in charge when Grantham won the Southern League Midland Division championship in 1997–98. They went on to work together at King's Lynn and Tamworth.

After Mills departed Tamworth to become first-team coach at Coventry City, Gee took over as manager in May 2002 on a three-year contract. He took them into the Football Conference from the Southern League Premier Division, winning the title by a 13-point margin in 2002–03. The same season saw Gee also take his team to the 2003 FA Trophy Final at Villa Park, where Tamworth were beaten 2–1 by Burscough on 18 May 2003.

Gee considered leaving Tamworth during January 2004 after he and his players received verbal abuse from some fans, but decided to continue after talks with his family and the club's chairman. Having led Tamworth to safety from relegation he announced in April 2004 that he would resign at the end of 2003–04, wanting to spend more time with his wife and young son, having been working continuously for four years. His resignation came into effect after their final match of the season, a 1–1 draw away to Aldershot Town on 24 April 2004.

Gee was appointed assistant manager at recently relegated League Two club Notts County on 10 May 2004 to be reunited Mills, thus fulfilling the promise Mills made to Gee when the pair started working together that they would go on to manage the Nottinghamshire club. Mills was dismissed on 4 November 2004, with Gee's departure coming a week later after his contract with the club was terminated. He commented in retrospect that "What happened at Notts County devastated us both. We had always been successful until then."

He joined Conference North club Alfreton Town as assistant manager to Mills on 25 May 2005, before being appointed as manager on 26 January 2007 following Mills' return to Conference club Tamworth. Gee managed Alfreton in one match, a 1–0 win over Leigh RMI on 27 January 2007, before leaving to join Mills at Tamworth as his assistant on 30 January. Tamworth were relegated at the end of 2006–07, before Mills and Gee led the team to promotion back into the Conference by winning the Conference North title in 2008–09.

Gee joined Tamworth's Conference Premier rivals York City as assistant manager on 13 October 2010 following Mills' appointment as manager. Mills and Gee led York to promotion to League Two with a 2–1 victory over Luton Town in the 2012 Conference Premier play-off final at Wembley Stadium, as well as a 2–0 win over Newport County at Wembley eight days earlier in the 2012 FA Trophy Final. Following York's promotion, Gee switched from part-time to full-time status, having previously combined his position as assistant manager with his directorship of a Nottingham-based CCTV company. Gee left York by mutual consent after two and a half years with the club on 4 March 2013, two days after Mills was dismissed as manager.

== Managerial statistics ==
As of 30 January 2007

Managerial record by team and tenure
Team	From	To	Record					Ref
Team	From	To	P	W	D	L	Win %	Ref
Dunkirk	1995	July 1996	36	23	8	5	63.9	
Tamworth	May 2002	24 April 2004	103	49	24	30	47.6	
Alfreton Town	26 January 2007	30 January 2007	1	1	0	0	100.0	
Total			140	73	32	35	52.1	—

== Honours ==
=== As a manager ===
Dunkirk

- Central Midlands League Premier Division runners-up: 1995–96

Tamworth

- Southern League Premier Division: 2002–03
