= Tamworth F.C. =

Association football club in Tamworth, England

- Full name: Tamworth Football Club
- Nickname: The Lambs
- Founded: 1933; 93 years ago
- Ground: The Lamb Ground
- Capacity: 4,963 (518 seated)
- Coordinates: 52.628403°N 1.688925°W
- Owner: Dawn Group International
- Chairman: Abdullah Ashraf
- Manager: Andy Peaks
- League: National League
- 2025–26: National League, 11th of 24
- Website: tamworthfootballclub.com
Home colours	Away colours

Tamworth Football Club is an association football club based in Tamworth, Staffordshire, England. The club competes in the National League, the fifth level of the English football league system, as of the 2026–27 season.

The club was formed in 1933 after the previous Tamworth club, Tamworth Castle, ceased to exist. After playing in the Birmingham Combination and West Midlands (Regional) League, the team reached the Southern League in 1972. Following a spell in the Northern Premier League between 1979 and 1983 and a single season back in the Southern League Tamworth subsequently fell on hard times and returned to lower-level football. In 1988 Tamworth returned to the Southern League and a year later won the FA Vase. Tamworth reached the final of the FA Trophy in 2003 and in the same season won promotion to the Football Conference, going on to spend four seasons at the highest level of non-League football before being relegated to the Conference North. In 2009 the club gained promotion back to the Conference Premier, and spent five seasons at that level before being relegated. Further relegation in 2018 took the club back to the Southern League.

The team originally played at The Jolly Sailor Ground but after a year moved into The Lamb Ground, named after a pub which formerly stood nearby. The stadium currently has a capacity of just under 5,000 and a 3G artificial pitch which was laid in 2016. Local rivals include Burton Albion and Nuneaton Borough, and to a lesser degree Atherstone Town, Bedworth United and Bolehall Swifts.

== History ==
=== Early years ===
The town of Tamworth had been represented at football by Tamworth Castle F.C. until the club folded in 1933. This void was filled thanks to a campaign started by a letter from a local businessman in the local newspaper setting in motion the formation of Tamworth F.C. Originally playing next to the Jolly Sailor pub, the club moved to their present ground, the Lamb Ground, in 1934. Tamworth began life competing in the Birmingham Combination, before joining the Birmingham and District League, subsequently renamed the West Midlands (Regional) League, in 1954. In the 1960s Tamworth experienced success, winning the league in 1963–64 and 1965–66 and finishing as runners-up on two other occasions, as well as lifting the West Midlands League Cup, Birmingham Senior Cup and Staffordshire Senior Cup in that decade.

In 1972 Tamworth gained promotion to the Southern League following a third West Midlands League title, but a period of falling attendances and financial difficulties followed. The club returned to the West Midlands League in 1984, and was taken over by a consortium of local businessmen. In 1987–88 Tamworth won the League and were promoted back to the Southern League.

=== FA Vase win and promotion to the Conference ===
In 1989 Tamworth, managed by Graham Smith, reached the final of the FA Vase for the first time, one year after gaining promotion back to the Southern League. The final against Sudbury Town was played at Wembley Stadium and finished in a 1–1 draw with Martin Devaney scoring for Tamworth, meaning that the winner would have to be decided by a replay. The replay was played at London Road, the home of Peterborough United, and Tamworth won 3–0 with two goals from Mark Stanton and one from Ian Moores to lift the FA Vase for the first time. In 1997 The Lambs won the championship of the Southern League Midland Division and gained promotion to the Premier Division.

In the 2001–02 season, Tamworth narrowly missed out on promotion to the Football Conference, the highest level of non-League football. The Lambs earned a 3–3 draw on the final day away to Folkestone Invicta but Kettering Town won their final game, allow them to overtake Tamworth for first place and win promotion to the Conference. The following season, however, Tamworth won the championship of the Southern League to gain promotion, finishing 13 points ahead of second-placed Stafford Rangers. In the same season Tamworth also reached the final of the FA Trophy where they played Burscough but were denied a double, losing 2–1 at Villa Park.

The club completed perhaps their highest profile signing of all time on 23 February 2006, with the capture of former England international midfielder Paul Merson. However, the arrangement meant that until the end of the season, the majority of Merson's wages were to be paid by the club he used to manage, Walsall. The arrangement however only lasted two games, although Merson only played once in the 2–1 home loss to Halifax Town. Merson was dropped to the bench for the following game, which was a 5–0 defeat away to Grays Athletic. Merson later announced his retirement from professional football as a player on 9 March 2006, less than a month after joining Tamworth. Although the club finished the 2005–06 season in 21st position (the last relegation position) in the Conference Premier, the club were spared the drop after Canvey Island resigned from the league. They also reached the third round of the FA Cup for the first time that season.

=== Relegation and return to the Conference Premier ===
Despite a fairly poor 2006–07 league campaign, Tamworth once again found themselves at the 3rd round stage of the FA Cup. Norwich City beat The Lambs, and 18 days later Tamworth manager Mark Cooper and assistant manager Richard Dryden were dismissed with the club at the foot of the league table. They were replaced two days later by the former Tamworth managerial duo of manager Gary Mills and assistant Darron Gee. Despite the change in leadership, Tamworth were relegated to the Conference North after finishing in 22nd position.

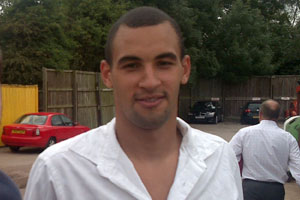
Nick Wright scored the goal which clinched the Conference North championship in 2009.

The club won promotion back to the Conference Premier at the second attempt, with a 1–0 win over Hinckley United on 21 April 2009 thanks to a goal from Nick Wright securing the title and promotion back to the Conference Premier.

On 13 October 2010, manager Gary Mills quit Tamworth to join fellow Conference Premier side York City, names of possible replacements started to circulate and many believed that Ian McParland had expressed interest in the job. However first team coach Des Lyttle became caretaker manager and was later hired as player-manager. He resigned as manager on 13 April 2011, and was replaced by Tamworth legend Dale Belford, who was to manage the club for the remaining four games of the season. Belford led Tamworth to last day safety with a 2–1 home win over Forest Green Rovers, with Jake Sheridan scoring the all-important winning goal. Belford stepped aside at the end of the season, and the search for a new manager to lead the club for the 2011–12 Conference Premier season began, speculation was rife, and the names of former York City manager Martin Foyle, Eastwood Town manager Paul Cox and former Walsall assistant manager Martin O'Connor were all linked to the club, but on 25 May 2011, Tamworth announced Kettering Town manager Marcus Law as the club's new manager.

Tamworth were defeated by Everton in the 3rd round of the 2011–12 FA Cup 2–0 on 6 January 2012. Around 5,000 Lambs supporters made the trip to Goodison Park.

Law was relieved of his managerial duties on 14 January 2013, and Dale Belford was appointed as caretaker manager for the foreseeable future with former Lambs player Scott Lindsey as his assistant.

=== Conference North and Southern League ===
The 2013–14 season was ultimately one to forget for the Lambs. In a season that included a few highlights such as progress to the 2nd round of the 2013–14 FA Cup, where they were beaten 2–1 at home to Bristol City, Tamworth could not survive in the league and finished 23rd, dropping down into the Conference North after five seasons in the English fifth tier. On 15 September 2014, with Tamworth in the bottom three of the Conference North, Belford left the club by mutual consent and was replaced by former Wrexham manager Andy Morrell. Despite a 12-game winning run, promotion was just out of reach as Tamworth failed to get into the play-offs on goal difference.

Tamworth began the 2018–19 season in the newly formed Southern League Premier Central, and announced a new first team management consisting of Mike Fowler, as head coach, Tim Harris as director of football and the return of Paul Green as player-coach.

On 10 September 2018, following a disappointing start to the season, head coach Mike Fowler stepped down from his role. Tim Harris also left the club on 20 September 2018, to take the director of football role at Hereford. On the same day Dennis Greene was confirmed as the club's new manager, but he remained in the post for only four months before being dismissed following a string of disappointing results. On 8 March 2019, Andrew Danylyszyn and former player Gary Smith were announced as joint managers for the club until the end of the season, with the management duo securing the job following a five-game unbeaten run while in a caretaker role at the club. Danylyszyn and Smith were jointly named manager of the month for March 2019 following four wins and a draw in their first five games in charge. Following much improved performances on the pitch, the duo steered the club away from relegation and secured a 12th position in their first season in the Southern League Premier Central. It was officially confirmed on 22 April 2019 that Danylyszyn and Smith had been appointed the club's permanent management duo, and would lead the club into the 2019–20 season. They were joined at the club by former Kettering Town and Stratford Town manager Thomas Baillie, who was appointed as Head of Senior Football.

After the dismissal of the previous trio, Rushden and Diamonds manager Andy Peaks was appointed as first team manager and the side went unbeaten to the end of the 2021–22 season.

=== Back to back promotions ===
Although not expected to challenge for promotion the following season, in the 2022–23 season, Tamworth were confirmed as the Southern League Premier Division Central champions, winning the division on goal difference at the expense of Coalville Town.

On the back of the success of the previous season Tamworth subsequently recorded a second successive promotion the following year, winning the 2023-24 National League North title with two games remaining.

In the 2024–25 season, Tamworth defeated League One side Huddersfield Town in the FA Cup first round. They then reached the FA Cup third round for only the fourth time in their history after defeating local rivals Burton Albion on penalties after securing a 1–1 draw. The Lambs' reward for their cup exploits was a home tie with Premier League Tottenham Hotspur. A capacity crowd saw The Lambs defy the odds and 96 places in the football pyramid to hold Spurs to a 0–0 draw after 90 minutes. Tottenham would eventually win 3–0 in extra time. In the build up to the Spurs game, it was announced that manager Andy Peaks had signed a new contract with the club which saw him commit to managing The Lambs as his full time job.

On 16 June 2026, the club announced that American businessman Abdullah Ashraf was the new owner and chairman of the club.

== Club colours ==
In the first season, Tamworth's first team kit was all black with red flashing, but changed to red and black with a blue and white away kit in the following seasons.

Tamworth now play in mainly red kit with black or red shorts and matching or complimentary socks.

The club's away kit colours change from season to season and have been dark blue, sky blue, white, yellow and luminous green.

== Club badge ==
The first Tamworth FC badges in the 1950s were caricatures of a lamb on a shield with the club name on banners above and below.

This was changed to a Fleur-De-Lys in the 1960s. The emblem appears on the towns coat of arms and was presented officially by the council to the club to use.

A new badge was designed in 1989 by members of the Football Club and is made up of 5 sections

1: The Saltire in Chief – a gold cross on a blue background

2: The Fess of Vair or Fesse Vair – from the historic coat of arms of the Marmion family.

3: The Stafford(shire) knot – this was a badge of the Stafford family and is linked to the Borough of Stafford

4: The Castle and the Crossed Swords – representing Tamworth Castle and the historical office of the Champion of England first granted to Robert Marmion in the reign of William the Conqueror.

5: The Fleur-De-Lys

== Shirt and shorts sponsors and manufacturers ==
Period	Kit manufacturer	Shirt sponsor
1999–2000	Prostar	Polesworth Garage
2000–2004	Nike	Bloor Homes
2004–2007	Nike	Ocean Finance
2007–2009	Umbro	Ocean Finance
2009–2012	Admiral	Snowdome
2012–2014	Jako	Solus Coaches
2014–2015	Jako	Bradley Scott Windows
2015–2016	Jako	J. Clarke Transport
2016–2017	Jako	Solus Coaches
2017–2018	Macron	Bradley Scott Windows
2018–2019	Macron	J. Clarke Transport
2019–2020	Macron	Home: Solus Coaches
2019–2020	Macron	Away: Turpins
2020–2021	Macron	Bradley Scott Windows
2021–2022	Macron	Bradley Scott Windows
2022–2023	Kappa	Home: J. Clarke Transport
2022–2023	Kappa	Away: Turpins
2023–2024	Kappa	Home: Bradley Scott Windows
2023–2024	Kappa	Away: Compare The Build
2024–2025	Macron	Home: Bradley Scott Windows
2024–2025	Macron	Away: Drayton Manor Park / Purewater

Following seven years with Nike, Inc., the club confirmed the kit manufacturer to be Umbro for the 2007/08 season.

Snowdome were confirmed as the club's new shirt sponsor on 24 June 2009, agreeing to a three-year shirt sponsorship deal with the club. Automotive Solutions agreed a one-year short sponsorship, while Admiral Sportswear would be manufacturing the club's players and replica kits.

On 14 July 2011, it was confirmed that Tamworth based IT Consultancy company, Computer Friendly Consultants would be renewing their back of shirt sponsor for the 2011–12 season. Solus Coaches were announced as the first team shorts sponsor for the 2011–12 season.

Tamworth announced on 27 March 2012 that their away kit for the 2012–13 season would be sponsored by Drayton Manor, with the club's kits now been supplied by Jako. The club followed this up on 26 April 2012 with confirmation that Solus Coaches would sponsor the team home shirt for the 2012–13 season. The club confirmed on 2 May 2013 the kits would again be supplied by and sponsored by the same companies as the previous season.

Tamworth confirmed on 30 June 2014 that their kits would again be made by Jako, and would be sponsored by two local companies, on the front of the shirts would be Bradley Scott Windows and on the back J. Clarke Transport.

Tamworth announced for 2016–17 season that the club's shirts would again be supplied by Jako, for the fifth season running, and the home shirt would again be sponsored by Solus Coaches and the away shirt would be sponsored by local restaurant Turpins.

For the 2017–18 season, Tamworth confirmed on 24 April 2017, their home shirts would be supplied by Macron Cardiff, and the shirt sponsor would be Bradley Scott Windows. On 23 April 2018 it was announced the club's kit would again be supplied by Macron Cardiff, and the shirt would be sponsored by J. Clarke Transport.

Tamworth confirmed on 24 April 2019 that their new kit for the 2019–20 season would be available from the club shop at the final match of the season, again kit supplied by Macron Cardiff, and Solus Coaches would return as the shirt sponsor.

It was confirmed on 17 August 2020, that Tamworth's shirt for the 2020–21 season would be kit supplied by Macron Cardiff for a fourth season, and would once again be sponsored by Bradley Scott Windows.

Tamworth finished the 2021–22 season on 23 April 2022, and alongside the club's end of season awards, it was announced that the club had signed a deal with Italian sports brand Kappa, with details of the shirt to be announced in due course.

The 2022–23 kit was sponsored by J. Clarke Transport again, with the away shirt sponsored by Turpins Bar and Grill.

Kappa were the kit supplier for the 2023–24 season as well, with Bradley Scott Windows sponsoring the home shirt and Compare The Build sponsoring the away kit.

The club returned to supplier Macron for 2024–25. The home shirt was sponsored by Bradley Scott Windows once again. The away shirt was launched with two main sponsors, Drayton Manor theme park and Purewater. The team played in the kit in alternating games to ensure maximum exposure for both sponsors. Compare the Build were a feature sponsor on the sleeve and rear of the shirt.

== Stadium ==
Tamworth have played at The Lamb Ground since 1934. The Lamb was considered for the first season but the club committee chose a more suitable ground adjacent to the Jolly Sailor pub and put a lot of work in to bringing it up to standard.

The club moved to The Lamb ground for their second season which takes its name from the pub, the Lamb Inn, which formerly stood on the entrance to the ground on the Kettlebrook Road.

The ground now has a capacity of approximately 4,000, a directors area, press areas and camera gantry.

All seating is in the Main Stand, which was constructed in 1997.

The Main Stand occupies one side of the pitch, with a covered terrace known as the Shed on the opposite side.

Work began on a new 3G pitch after the 2015–16 season finished, and was the first of its kind in the Conference North. It was ready in time for the 2016–17 season and is now available for the community as a whole to use seven days a week.

The club installed their first floodlights in 1967–68 and replaced the ten pylons (one of which had been earlier removed for the main stand in 1997) in 2020 with four state of the art LED floodlights.

A new clubhouse was built to replace the old one in 2021.

== Current squad ==
=== First-team squad ===
As of 3 October 2026

Note: Flags indicate national team as defined under FIFA eligibility rules; some limited exceptions apply. Players may hold more than one non-FIFA nationality.

No.	Pos.	Nation	Player
1	GK	ENG	Jas Singh (vice-captain)
2	DF	ENG	Tyler Lyttle
3	DF	ENG	Tom Handley
4	MF	ENG	Teo Kurtaran
5	DF	ENG	Tom Parkes
6	MF	ANT	TJ Bramble
7	MF	ENG	Ben Acquaye
8	MF	ENG	Ben Milnes (captain)
9	FW	ENG	Dan Creaney
10	FW	ENG	Kieren Donnelly
11	DF	ENG	Luke Fairlamb
12	DF	ENG	Joe Rye
13	GK	ENG	Daniel Rachel
14	DF	ENG	Oliver Dyson

No.	Pos.	Nation	Player
16	MF	ENG	Riccardo Calder
18	DF	ENG	Jordan Cullinane-Liburd
19	MF	ENG	Tom McGlinchey
20	MF	ENG	Nathan Tshikuna
21	GK	SWE	Jonathan Macaulay (on loan from Watford)
23	FW	ENG	Jake Hutchinson
24	DF	KEN	Sydney Agina (on loan from Stoke City)
25	MF	WAL	Ryan Howley (on loan from Bristol Rovers)
26	DF	ENG	Haydn Hollis
28	MF	IRL	Gabriel Kelly (on loan from Stoke City)
29	DF	ENG	Hayden Carson (on loan from Salford City)
30	MF	WAL	Morgan Roberts
39	GK	ENG	Rhys Lovett

=== Academy ===
As of 3 October 2026

Note: Flags indicate national team as defined under FIFA eligibility rules; some limited exceptions apply. Players may hold more than one non-FIFA nationality.

No.	Pos.	Nation	Player
34	MF	ENG	Charlie Edge
36	MF	ENG	Jude Thomas

No.	Pos.	Nation	Player
37	DF	ENG	CJ Nyakuhwa
38	MF	ENG	Tino Shumba

=== Out on loan ===
As of 3 October 2026

Note: Flags indicate national team as defined under FIFA eligibility rules; some limited exceptions apply. Players may hold more than one non-FIFA nationality.

No.	Pos.	Nation	Player
22	DF	NIR	Tommy Fogarty (on loan to Brackley Town until 10 October 2026)
32	MF	ENG	Adam Jasper (on loan to Bromsgrove Sporting)
33	FW	ENG	Taylor Wyse (on loan to Shepshed Dynamo until end of 2026–27 season)

No.	Pos.	Nation	Player
35	DF	ENG	Josh Bailey (on loan to Halesowen until 25 October 2026)
40	MF	ENG	Lucas Brown (on loan to Shepshed Dynamo until end of 2026–27 season)
41	FW	POR	Vanylson Silva (on dual registration to Halesowen Town)

== Non-playing staff ==
=== Current staff ===
As of 26 May 2022

Position	Name
Manager	(England) Andy Peaks
Assistant Manager	(England) Neil Champelovier
First Team Coach	(England) Tim Dudding
Goalkeeper Coach	(England) Gary Price
Physio	(England) Bethany Willment
Scholarship Manager	(England) Scott Rickards
Scholarship Coaches	(England) Robbie Banks (England) Stefan Moore (England) Mark Phillips
Scholarship Therapist	(England) Niamh McLaughlin
Academy Manager (U7-U16)	(England) Scott Rickards
Age Group Lead Coaches	(England) Tom Armitage (England) Jack Ball (England) Archie Baynham (England) Mark Bridgen (England) Josh Butler (England) Joseph Czechowski (England) Stuart Ealing (England) Ryan Freer (England) Morris Griffith (England) Kane Hemmings (England) Dom Hinks (England) James Hubball (England) Dale Hutchinson (England) Rich Lacey (England) Dan Layton (England) Paul Manton (England) Adam McAneny (England) Keith O’Connor (England) Harry Bryan (England) Josh Thomas (England) Mark Thomas (England) Ryan Thorpe (England) Adrian Winfield

== Supporters' Player of the Year ==
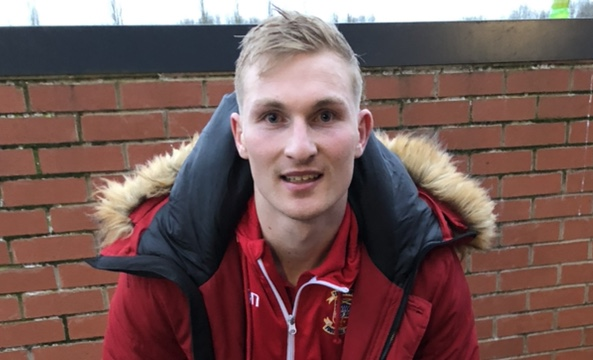
Chris Lait won the award for the 2018–19 season.

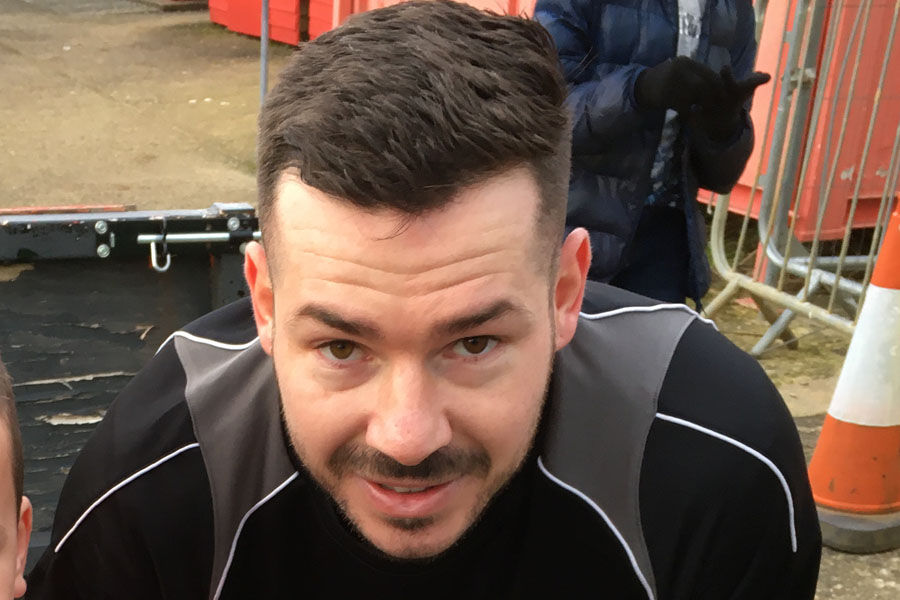
Ryan Beswick won the award for the 2019–20 season.

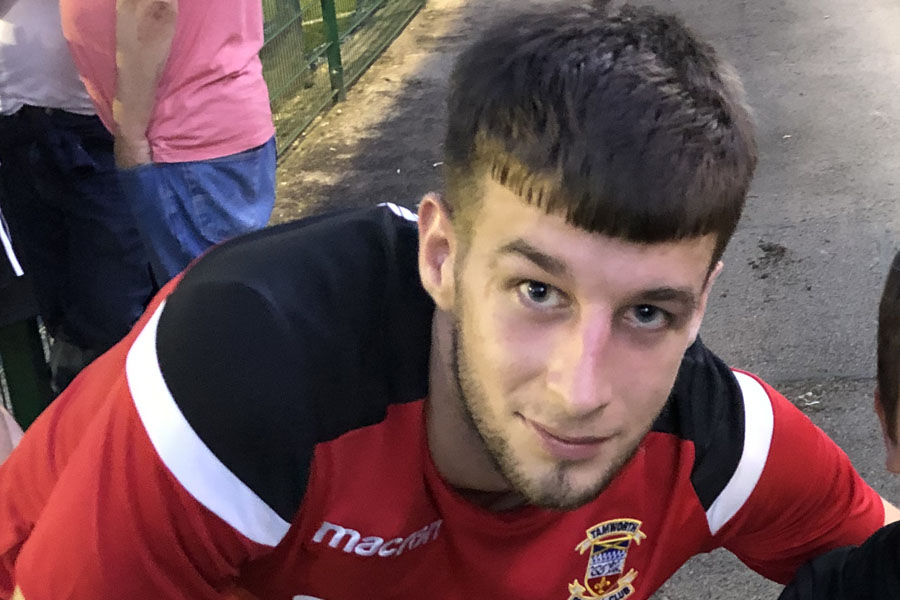
Henri Wilder won the award for the 2021–22 season.

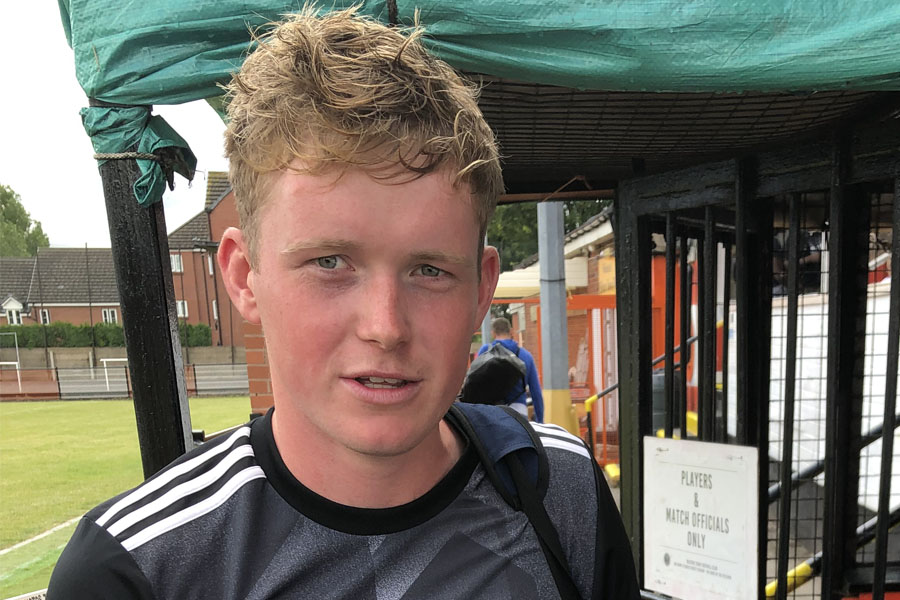
Dan Creaney won the award for the 2022–23 season.

Player name in bold represents players still on the playing staff of the club.

Season	Level	Name	Nationality	Position	Notes	Ref
1988–89	7	Mark Stanton	Striker	England		
1994–95	7	Jon Howard	Defender	England		
1997–98	6	Tim Steele	Midfielder	England		
2006–07	5	José Veiga	Goalkeeper	Cape Verde		
2007–08	6	Gareth Sheldon	Striker	England		
2008–09	6	Gareth Sheldon	Striker	England		
2009–10	5	Danny Alcock	Goalkeeper	England		
2010–11	5	Kyle Perry	Striker	England		
2011–12	5	Richard Tait	Defender	Scotland		
2012–13	5	Duane Courtney	Defender	England		
2013–14	5	Lloyd Kerry	Midfielder	England		
2014–15	6	James Belshaw	Goalkeeper	England		
2015–16	6	James Belshaw	Goalkeeper	England		
2016–17	6	Danny Newton	Striker	England		
2017–18	6	Connor Taylor	Midfielder	England		
2018–19	7	Chris Lait	Striker	England		
2019–20	7	Ryan Beswick	Midfielder	England		
2020–21	7	No Award				
2021–22	7	Henri Wilder	Defender	England		
2022–23	7	**Dan Creaney**	Striker	England		
2023–24	6	**Jordan Cullinane-Liburd**	Defender	England		
2024–25	5	Tom Tonks	Midfielder	England		
2025–26	5	Kennedy Digie	Defender	England		
2026–27	5					

== Honours ==
League

- Conference North / National League North (level 6)
  - Champions: 2008–09, 2023–24
- Southern Football League Premier Division (level 7)
  - Champions: 2002–03, 2022–23*(* As Southern Premier Central Division)
  - Runners-up: 2001–02
- Southern Football League Division One Midlands
  - Champions: 1996–97
- West Midlands (Regional) League
  - Champions: 1963–64, 1965–66, 1971–72, 1987–88

Cup

- FA Trophy
  - Runners-up: 2002–03
- FA Vase
  - Winners: 1988–89
- West Midlands League Cup
  - Winners: 1964–65, 1965–66, 1971–72, 1985–86, 1987–88
- Birmingham Senior Cup
  - Winners: 1960–61, 1965–66, 1968–69, 2024–25, 2025-26
- Staffordshire Senior Cup
  - Winners: 1958–59, 1963–64, 1965–66, 2001–02
- Harry Godfrey Trophy
  - Winners: 1993–94, 1996–97
- Bass Charity Vase
  - Winners: 1936–37

== Records ==
- Best league position: 10th in National League (level 5), 2024–25
- Best FA Cup performance: 3rd round, 2005–06, 2006–07, 2011–12, 2024–25
- Best FA Trophy performance: Runners-up, 2002–03
- Best FA Vase performance: Winners, 1988–89 (replay)
- Record transfer paid: £7,500 to Ilkeston Town for Tony Hemmings, 2000
- Record transfer received: £12,000 from Kidderminster Harriers for Scott Rickards, 2003
- Record attendance: 4,920 v Atherstone Town, 1948
- Record victory: 14–4 v Holbrook Institute, 1933
- Record defeat: 11–0 v Solihull Borough, 1940

== See also ==
- Tamworth F.C. players
- Tamworth F.C. managers
